

242001–242100 

|-bgcolor=#E9E9E9
| 242001 ||  || — || July 18, 2002 || Socorro || LINEAR || — || align=right | 1.8 km || 
|-id=002 bgcolor=#E9E9E9
| 242002 ||  || — || August 4, 2002 || Reedy Creek || J. Broughton || PAE || align=right | 4.2 km || 
|-id=003 bgcolor=#E9E9E9
| 242003 ||  || — || August 6, 2002 || Palomar || NEAT || — || align=right | 2.0 km || 
|-id=004 bgcolor=#d6d6d6
| 242004 ||  || — || August 5, 2002 || Palomar || NEAT || URS || align=right | 6.3 km || 
|-id=005 bgcolor=#E9E9E9
| 242005 ||  || — || August 11, 2002 || Socorro || LINEAR || — || align=right | 3.1 km || 
|-id=006 bgcolor=#E9E9E9
| 242006 ||  || — || August 12, 2002 || Socorro || LINEAR || JNS || align=right | 3.7 km || 
|-id=007 bgcolor=#E9E9E9
| 242007 ||  || — || August 12, 2002 || Socorro || LINEAR || ADE || align=right | 3.3 km || 
|-id=008 bgcolor=#d6d6d6
| 242008 ||  || — || August 9, 2002 || Socorro || LINEAR || HIL || align=right | 7.6 km || 
|-id=009 bgcolor=#fefefe
| 242009 ||  || — || August 13, 2002 || Socorro || LINEAR || H || align=right data-sort-value="0.80" | 800 m || 
|-id=010 bgcolor=#E9E9E9
| 242010 ||  || — || August 14, 2002 || Socorro || LINEAR || — || align=right | 3.8 km || 
|-id=011 bgcolor=#E9E9E9
| 242011 ||  || — || August 14, 2002 || Palomar || NEAT || — || align=right | 3.2 km || 
|-id=012 bgcolor=#d6d6d6
| 242012 ||  || — || August 13, 2002 || Anderson Mesa || LONEOS || — || align=right | 5.0 km || 
|-id=013 bgcolor=#E9E9E9
| 242013 ||  || — || August 14, 2002 || Palomar || NEAT || JUN || align=right | 1.6 km || 
|-id=014 bgcolor=#E9E9E9
| 242014 ||  || — || August 13, 2002 || Socorro || LINEAR || — || align=right | 2.6 km || 
|-id=015 bgcolor=#E9E9E9
| 242015 ||  || — || August 8, 2002 || Palomar || S. F. Hönig || — || align=right | 1.4 km || 
|-id=016 bgcolor=#d6d6d6
| 242016 ||  || — || August 8, 2002 || Palomar || S. F. Hönig || HIL || align=right | 6.4 km || 
|-id=017 bgcolor=#d6d6d6
| 242017 ||  || — || August 7, 2002 || Palomar || NEAT || VER || align=right | 5.1 km || 
|-id=018 bgcolor=#E9E9E9
| 242018 ||  || — || August 16, 2002 || Anderson Mesa || LONEOS || BRU || align=right | 4.5 km || 
|-id=019 bgcolor=#E9E9E9
| 242019 ||  || — || August 16, 2002 || Palomar || NEAT || — || align=right | 3.4 km || 
|-id=020 bgcolor=#E9E9E9
| 242020 ||  || — || August 20, 2002 || Palomar || NEAT || — || align=right | 3.8 km || 
|-id=021 bgcolor=#d6d6d6
| 242021 ||  || — || August 26, 2002 || Palomar || NEAT || — || align=right | 5.3 km || 
|-id=022 bgcolor=#d6d6d6
| 242022 ||  || — || August 26, 2002 || Palomar || NEAT || — || align=right | 3.9 km || 
|-id=023 bgcolor=#E9E9E9
| 242023 ||  || — || August 29, 2002 || Palomar || NEAT || — || align=right | 3.0 km || 
|-id=024 bgcolor=#E9E9E9
| 242024 ||  || — || August 29, 2002 || Palomar || R. Matson || HEN || align=right | 1.3 km || 
|-id=025 bgcolor=#d6d6d6
| 242025 ||  || — || August 29, 2002 || Palomar || S. F. Hönig || — || align=right | 5.0 km || 
|-id=026 bgcolor=#E9E9E9
| 242026 ||  || — || August 16, 2002 || Palomar || NEAT || — || align=right | 2.6 km || 
|-id=027 bgcolor=#E9E9E9
| 242027 ||  || — || August 16, 2002 || Haleakala || NEAT || HEN || align=right | 1.5 km || 
|-id=028 bgcolor=#E9E9E9
| 242028 ||  || — || August 17, 2002 || Palomar || NEAT || — || align=right | 3.3 km || 
|-id=029 bgcolor=#E9E9E9
| 242029 ||  || — || August 30, 2002 || Palomar || NEAT || — || align=right | 2.1 km || 
|-id=030 bgcolor=#E9E9E9
| 242030 ||  || — || August 16, 2002 || Palomar || NEAT || — || align=right | 2.1 km || 
|-id=031 bgcolor=#d6d6d6
| 242031 ||  || — || August 18, 2002 || Palomar || NEAT || — || align=right | 4.4 km || 
|-id=032 bgcolor=#d6d6d6
| 242032 ||  || — || August 30, 2002 || Palomar || NEAT || — || align=right | 3.4 km || 
|-id=033 bgcolor=#E9E9E9
| 242033 ||  || — || August 27, 2002 || Palomar || NEAT || — || align=right | 2.5 km || 
|-id=034 bgcolor=#E9E9E9
| 242034 ||  || — || August 16, 2002 || Palomar || NEAT || — || align=right | 1.5 km || 
|-id=035 bgcolor=#E9E9E9
| 242035 ||  || — || August 30, 2002 || Palomar || NEAT || — || align=right | 2.7 km || 
|-id=036 bgcolor=#fefefe
| 242036 ||  || — || September 4, 2002 || Anderson Mesa || LONEOS || — || align=right | 1.6 km || 
|-id=037 bgcolor=#E9E9E9
| 242037 ||  || — || September 4, 2002 || Anderson Mesa || LONEOS || — || align=right | 3.1 km || 
|-id=038 bgcolor=#E9E9E9
| 242038 ||  || — || September 5, 2002 || Anderson Mesa || LONEOS || — || align=right | 1.3 km || 
|-id=039 bgcolor=#E9E9E9
| 242039 ||  || — || September 5, 2002 || Anderson Mesa || LONEOS || — || align=right | 2.6 km || 
|-id=040 bgcolor=#E9E9E9
| 242040 ||  || — || September 4, 2002 || Palomar || NEAT || ADE || align=right | 3.0 km || 
|-id=041 bgcolor=#E9E9E9
| 242041 ||  || — || September 5, 2002 || Socorro || LINEAR || — || align=right | 2.4 km || 
|-id=042 bgcolor=#d6d6d6
| 242042 ||  || — || September 5, 2002 || Socorro || LINEAR || — || align=right | 4.0 km || 
|-id=043 bgcolor=#d6d6d6
| 242043 ||  || — || September 8, 2002 || Haleakala || NEAT || — || align=right | 4.3 km || 
|-id=044 bgcolor=#d6d6d6
| 242044 ||  || — || September 11, 2002 || Palomar || NEAT || NAE || align=right | 4.9 km || 
|-id=045 bgcolor=#E9E9E9
| 242045 ||  || — || September 10, 2002 || Haleakala || NEAT || EUN || align=right | 1.7 km || 
|-id=046 bgcolor=#E9E9E9
| 242046 ||  || — || September 10, 2002 || Palomar || NEAT || — || align=right | 2.1 km || 
|-id=047 bgcolor=#E9E9E9
| 242047 ||  || — || September 10, 2002 || Palomar || NEAT || EUN || align=right | 1.7 km || 
|-id=048 bgcolor=#E9E9E9
| 242048 ||  || — || September 11, 2002 || Palomar || NEAT || — || align=right | 2.8 km || 
|-id=049 bgcolor=#d6d6d6
| 242049 ||  || — || September 11, 2002 || Palomar || NEAT || — || align=right | 4.1 km || 
|-id=050 bgcolor=#E9E9E9
| 242050 ||  || — || September 14, 2002 || Palomar || NEAT || HNA || align=right | 4.0 km || 
|-id=051 bgcolor=#d6d6d6
| 242051 ||  || — || September 15, 2002 || Haleakala || NEAT || EOS || align=right | 3.5 km || 
|-id=052 bgcolor=#E9E9E9
| 242052 ||  || — || September 14, 2002 || Haleakala || NEAT || DOR || align=right | 3.9 km || 
|-id=053 bgcolor=#E9E9E9
| 242053 ||  || — || September 14, 2002 || Palomar || NEAT || — || align=right | 3.1 km || 
|-id=054 bgcolor=#E9E9E9
| 242054 ||  || — || September 14, 2002 || Palomar || NEAT || NEM || align=right | 3.0 km || 
|-id=055 bgcolor=#d6d6d6
| 242055 ||  || — || September 3, 2002 || Palomar || NEAT || — || align=right | 6.5 km || 
|-id=056 bgcolor=#E9E9E9
| 242056 ||  || — || September 10, 2002 || Palomar || NEAT || — || align=right | 3.7 km || 
|-id=057 bgcolor=#E9E9E9
| 242057 ||  || — || September 27, 2002 || Palomar || NEAT || JUL || align=right | 1.8 km || 
|-id=058 bgcolor=#E9E9E9
| 242058 ||  || — || September 27, 2002 || Socorro || LINEAR || — || align=right | 1.4 km || 
|-id=059 bgcolor=#E9E9E9
| 242059 ||  || — || September 28, 2002 || Haleakala || NEAT || KON || align=right | 4.4 km || 
|-id=060 bgcolor=#d6d6d6
| 242060 ||  || — || September 28, 2002 || Haleakala || NEAT || — || align=right | 4.7 km || 
|-id=061 bgcolor=#E9E9E9
| 242061 ||  || — || September 16, 2002 || Palomar || NEAT || — || align=right | 1.6 km || 
|-id=062 bgcolor=#d6d6d6
| 242062 ||  || — || October 1, 2002 || Anderson Mesa || LONEOS || TRP || align=right | 4.7 km || 
|-id=063 bgcolor=#E9E9E9
| 242063 ||  || — || October 2, 2002 || Socorro || LINEAR || — || align=right | 2.1 km || 
|-id=064 bgcolor=#fefefe
| 242064 ||  || — || October 2, 2002 || Socorro || LINEAR || — || align=right | 1.9 km || 
|-id=065 bgcolor=#d6d6d6
| 242065 ||  || — || October 2, 2002 || Socorro || LINEAR || EUP || align=right | 7.0 km || 
|-id=066 bgcolor=#E9E9E9
| 242066 ||  || — || October 2, 2002 || Haleakala || NEAT || — || align=right | 1.4 km || 
|-id=067 bgcolor=#E9E9E9
| 242067 ||  || — || October 2, 2002 || Campo Imperatore || CINEOS || — || align=right | 3.7 km || 
|-id=068 bgcolor=#E9E9E9
| 242068 ||  || — || October 1, 2002 || Socorro || LINEAR || — || align=right | 3.4 km || 
|-id=069 bgcolor=#d6d6d6
| 242069 ||  || — || October 3, 2002 || Palomar || NEAT || LIX || align=right | 5.8 km || 
|-id=070 bgcolor=#fefefe
| 242070 ||  || — || October 4, 2002 || Socorro || LINEAR || FLO || align=right | 1.3 km || 
|-id=071 bgcolor=#d6d6d6
| 242071 ||  || — || October 4, 2002 || Palomar || NEAT || — || align=right | 4.6 km || 
|-id=072 bgcolor=#d6d6d6
| 242072 ||  || — || October 4, 2002 || Anderson Mesa || LONEOS || LIX || align=right | 6.0 km || 
|-id=073 bgcolor=#E9E9E9
| 242073 ||  || — || October 5, 2002 || Palomar || NEAT || — || align=right | 3.7 km || 
|-id=074 bgcolor=#E9E9E9
| 242074 ||  || — || October 3, 2002 || Palomar || NEAT || — || align=right | 3.1 km || 
|-id=075 bgcolor=#d6d6d6
| 242075 ||  || — || October 4, 2002 || Anderson Mesa || LONEOS || — || align=right | 5.2 km || 
|-id=076 bgcolor=#E9E9E9
| 242076 ||  || — || October 13, 2002 || Palomar || NEAT || — || align=right | 2.0 km || 
|-id=077 bgcolor=#d6d6d6
| 242077 ||  || — || October 4, 2002 || Socorro || LINEAR || CHA || align=right | 3.7 km || 
|-id=078 bgcolor=#E9E9E9
| 242078 ||  || — || October 3, 2002 || Palomar || NEAT || GER || align=right | 2.9 km || 
|-id=079 bgcolor=#E9E9E9
| 242079 ||  || — || October 5, 2002 || Anderson Mesa || LONEOS || MIT || align=right | 3.7 km || 
|-id=080 bgcolor=#E9E9E9
| 242080 ||  || — || October 3, 2002 || Kitt Peak || Spacewatch || ADE || align=right | 3.2 km || 
|-id=081 bgcolor=#E9E9E9
| 242081 ||  || — || October 7, 2002 || Haleakala || NEAT || — || align=right | 2.5 km || 
|-id=082 bgcolor=#d6d6d6
| 242082 ||  || — || October 6, 2002 || Palomar || NEAT || THB || align=right | 5.4 km || 
|-id=083 bgcolor=#E9E9E9
| 242083 ||  || — || October 7, 2002 || Socorro || LINEAR || — || align=right | 2.1 km || 
|-id=084 bgcolor=#E9E9E9
| 242084 ||  || — || October 8, 2002 || Anderson Mesa || LONEOS || DOR || align=right | 4.3 km || 
|-id=085 bgcolor=#d6d6d6
| 242085 ||  || — || October 6, 2002 || Socorro || LINEAR || — || align=right | 7.4 km || 
|-id=086 bgcolor=#d6d6d6
| 242086 ||  || — || October 10, 2002 || Socorro || LINEAR || — || align=right | 6.4 km || 
|-id=087 bgcolor=#d6d6d6
| 242087 ||  || — || October 10, 2002 || Socorro || LINEAR || — || align=right | 6.0 km || 
|-id=088 bgcolor=#fefefe
| 242088 ||  || — || October 10, 2002 || Socorro || LINEAR || H || align=right | 1.1 km || 
|-id=089 bgcolor=#E9E9E9
| 242089 ||  || — || October 10, 2002 || Socorro || LINEAR || — || align=right | 3.2 km || 
|-id=090 bgcolor=#E9E9E9
| 242090 ||  || — || October 13, 2002 || Palomar || NEAT || — || align=right | 2.4 km || 
|-id=091 bgcolor=#E9E9E9
| 242091 ||  || — || October 12, 2002 || Socorro || LINEAR || — || align=right | 3.7 km || 
|-id=092 bgcolor=#E9E9E9
| 242092 ||  || — || October 15, 2002 || Palomar || NEAT || — || align=right | 3.7 km || 
|-id=093 bgcolor=#d6d6d6
| 242093 ||  || — || October 10, 2002 || Apache Point || SDSS || — || align=right | 4.0 km || 
|-id=094 bgcolor=#E9E9E9
| 242094 ||  || — || October 10, 2002 || Apache Point || SDSS || — || align=right | 2.9 km || 
|-id=095 bgcolor=#d6d6d6
| 242095 ||  || — || October 4, 2002 || Apache Point || SDSS || — || align=right | 3.7 km || 
|-id=096 bgcolor=#E9E9E9
| 242096 ||  || — || October 28, 2002 || Palomar || NEAT || — || align=right | 3.4 km || 
|-id=097 bgcolor=#E9E9E9
| 242097 ||  || — || October 30, 2002 || Haleakala || NEAT || ADE || align=right | 1.9 km || 
|-id=098 bgcolor=#d6d6d6
| 242098 ||  || — || October 30, 2002 || Haleakala || NEAT || LIX || align=right | 8.2 km || 
|-id=099 bgcolor=#d6d6d6
| 242099 ||  || — || October 31, 2002 || Anderson Mesa || LONEOS || EUP || align=right | 6.0 km || 
|-id=100 bgcolor=#d6d6d6
| 242100 ||  || — || October 31, 2002 || Anderson Mesa || LONEOS || — || align=right | 5.2 km || 
|}

242101–242200 

|-bgcolor=#E9E9E9
| 242101 ||  || — || October 31, 2002 || Palomar || NEAT || — || align=right | 4.2 km || 
|-id=102 bgcolor=#E9E9E9
| 242102 ||  || — || October 31, 2002 || Palomar || NEAT || — || align=right | 2.4 km || 
|-id=103 bgcolor=#E9E9E9
| 242103 ||  || — || October 29, 2002 || Apache Point || SDSS || — || align=right | 2.9 km || 
|-id=104 bgcolor=#fefefe
| 242104 ||  || — || November 4, 2002 || Anderson Mesa || LONEOS || NYS || align=right | 2.0 km || 
|-id=105 bgcolor=#d6d6d6
| 242105 ||  || — || November 4, 2002 || Kitt Peak || Spacewatch || — || align=right | 4.1 km || 
|-id=106 bgcolor=#d6d6d6
| 242106 ||  || — || November 5, 2002 || Socorro || LINEAR || — || align=right | 5.7 km || 
|-id=107 bgcolor=#E9E9E9
| 242107 ||  || — || November 5, 2002 || Socorro || LINEAR || — || align=right | 2.5 km || 
|-id=108 bgcolor=#E9E9E9
| 242108 ||  || — || November 6, 2002 || Socorro || LINEAR || ADE || align=right | 3.9 km || 
|-id=109 bgcolor=#E9E9E9
| 242109 ||  || — || November 8, 2002 || Socorro || LINEAR || — || align=right | 1.7 km || 
|-id=110 bgcolor=#fefefe
| 242110 ||  || — || November 7, 2002 || Socorro || LINEAR || — || align=right | 2.0 km || 
|-id=111 bgcolor=#d6d6d6
| 242111 ||  || — || November 7, 2002 || Socorro || LINEAR || — || align=right | 3.9 km || 
|-id=112 bgcolor=#fefefe
| 242112 ||  || — || November 11, 2002 || Socorro || LINEAR || PHO || align=right | 1.5 km || 
|-id=113 bgcolor=#d6d6d6
| 242113 ||  || — || November 11, 2002 || Socorro || LINEAR || — || align=right | 4.5 km || 
|-id=114 bgcolor=#d6d6d6
| 242114 ||  || — || November 12, 2002 || Socorro || LINEAR || — || align=right | 6.0 km || 
|-id=115 bgcolor=#E9E9E9
| 242115 ||  || — || November 13, 2002 || Palomar || NEAT || — || align=right | 2.3 km || 
|-id=116 bgcolor=#E9E9E9
| 242116 ||  || — || November 6, 2002 || Socorro || LINEAR || — || align=right | 2.5 km || 
|-id=117 bgcolor=#E9E9E9
| 242117 ||  || — || November 7, 2002 || Kitt Peak || M. W. Buie || — || align=right | 1.9 km || 
|-id=118 bgcolor=#E9E9E9
| 242118 ||  || — || November 13, 2002 || Palomar || NEAT || MAR || align=right | 2.5 km || 
|-id=119 bgcolor=#d6d6d6
| 242119 ||  || — || November 5, 2002 || Palomar || NEAT || HYG || align=right | 3.6 km || 
|-id=120 bgcolor=#d6d6d6
| 242120 ||  || — || November 4, 2002 || Palomar || NEAT || — || align=right | 4.0 km || 
|-id=121 bgcolor=#E9E9E9
| 242121 ||  || — || November 24, 2002 || Palomar || NEAT || — || align=right | 2.9 km || 
|-id=122 bgcolor=#E9E9E9
| 242122 ||  || — || November 27, 2002 || Anderson Mesa || LONEOS || ADE || align=right | 4.4 km || 
|-id=123 bgcolor=#E9E9E9
| 242123 ||  || — || November 30, 2002 || Socorro || LINEAR || MIT || align=right | 2.1 km || 
|-id=124 bgcolor=#E9E9E9
| 242124 ||  || — || November 30, 2002 || Socorro || LINEAR || — || align=right | 3.3 km || 
|-id=125 bgcolor=#E9E9E9
| 242125 ||  || — || November 30, 2002 || Socorro || LINEAR || — || align=right | 2.2 km || 
|-id=126 bgcolor=#d6d6d6
| 242126 ||  || — || December 3, 2002 || Palomar || NEAT || — || align=right | 3.5 km || 
|-id=127 bgcolor=#d6d6d6
| 242127 ||  || — || December 2, 2002 || Socorro || LINEAR || — || align=right | 6.0 km || 
|-id=128 bgcolor=#d6d6d6
| 242128 ||  || — || December 6, 2002 || Socorro || LINEAR || — || align=right | 8.1 km || 
|-id=129 bgcolor=#fefefe
| 242129 ||  || — || December 10, 2002 || Socorro || LINEAR || — || align=right | 1.8 km || 
|-id=130 bgcolor=#d6d6d6
| 242130 ||  || — || December 10, 2002 || Socorro || LINEAR || — || align=right | 6.4 km || 
|-id=131 bgcolor=#E9E9E9
| 242131 ||  || — || December 10, 2002 || Socorro || LINEAR || — || align=right | 2.5 km || 
|-id=132 bgcolor=#d6d6d6
| 242132 ||  || — || December 10, 2002 || Palomar || NEAT || URS || align=right | 5.6 km || 
|-id=133 bgcolor=#d6d6d6
| 242133 ||  || — || December 31, 2002 || Anderson Mesa || LONEOS || EUP || align=right | 6.9 km || 
|-id=134 bgcolor=#d6d6d6
| 242134 ||  || — || December 31, 2002 || Socorro || LINEAR || — || align=right | 5.6 km || 
|-id=135 bgcolor=#E9E9E9
| 242135 ||  || — || January 1, 2003 || Kingsnake || J. V. McClusky || — || align=right | 4.9 km || 
|-id=136 bgcolor=#d6d6d6
| 242136 ||  || — || January 5, 2003 || Socorro || LINEAR || HYG || align=right | 3.4 km || 
|-id=137 bgcolor=#E9E9E9
| 242137 ||  || — || January 4, 2003 || Socorro || LINEAR || — || align=right | 3.1 km || 
|-id=138 bgcolor=#E9E9E9
| 242138 ||  || — || January 5, 2003 || Socorro || LINEAR || — || align=right | 3.0 km || 
|-id=139 bgcolor=#d6d6d6
| 242139 ||  || — || January 5, 2003 || Socorro || LINEAR || URS || align=right | 4.7 km || 
|-id=140 bgcolor=#d6d6d6
| 242140 ||  || — || January 7, 2003 || Socorro || LINEAR || — || align=right | 6.6 km || 
|-id=141 bgcolor=#d6d6d6
| 242141 ||  || — || January 15, 2003 || Palomar || NEAT || — || align=right | 4.7 km || 
|-id=142 bgcolor=#E9E9E9
| 242142 ||  || — || January 7, 2003 || Socorro || LINEAR || — || align=right | 2.1 km || 
|-id=143 bgcolor=#fefefe
| 242143 ||  || — || January 24, 2003 || Palomar || NEAT || PHO || align=right | 1.7 km || 
|-id=144 bgcolor=#E9E9E9
| 242144 ||  || — || January 26, 2003 || Anderson Mesa || LONEOS || — || align=right | 3.6 km || 
|-id=145 bgcolor=#d6d6d6
| 242145 ||  || — || January 27, 2003 || Haleakala || NEAT || — || align=right | 3.9 km || 
|-id=146 bgcolor=#d6d6d6
| 242146 ||  || — || January 31, 2003 || Socorro || LINEAR || — || align=right | 5.2 km || 
|-id=147 bgcolor=#FFC2E0
| 242147 ||  || — || January 25, 2003 || La Silla || A. Boattini, H. Scholl || APO +1km || align=right | 1.7 km || 
|-id=148 bgcolor=#d6d6d6
| 242148 ||  || — || February 1, 2003 || Anderson Mesa || LONEOS || HIL3:2 || align=right | 3.9 km || 
|-id=149 bgcolor=#d6d6d6
| 242149 ||  || — || February 1, 2003 || Socorro || LINEAR || HIL3:2 || align=right | 5.9 km || 
|-id=150 bgcolor=#d6d6d6
| 242150 ||  || — || February 2, 2003 || Socorro || LINEAR || — || align=right | 4.3 km || 
|-id=151 bgcolor=#d6d6d6
| 242151 ||  || — || February 4, 2003 || Socorro || LINEAR || 7:4 || align=right | 6.0 km || 
|-id=152 bgcolor=#E9E9E9
| 242152 ||  || — || February 21, 2003 || Palomar || NEAT || — || align=right | 3.2 km || 
|-id=153 bgcolor=#fefefe
| 242153 ||  || — || February 23, 2003 || Črni Vrh || H. Mikuž || PHO || align=right | 1.6 km || 
|-id=154 bgcolor=#fefefe
| 242154 ||  || — || March 6, 2003 || Anderson Mesa || LONEOS || — || align=right | 1.0 km || 
|-id=155 bgcolor=#E9E9E9
| 242155 ||  || — || March 8, 2003 || Anderson Mesa || LONEOS || MIT || align=right | 3.4 km || 
|-id=156 bgcolor=#d6d6d6
| 242156 ||  || — || March 8, 2003 || Palomar || NEAT || — || align=right | 5.2 km || 
|-id=157 bgcolor=#fefefe
| 242157 ||  || — || March 20, 2003 || Palomar || NEAT || — || align=right | 1.3 km || 
|-id=158 bgcolor=#d6d6d6
| 242158 ||  || — || March 31, 2003 || Palomar || NEAT || EUP || align=right | 7.1 km || 
|-id=159 bgcolor=#d6d6d6
| 242159 ||  || — || March 24, 2003 || Haleakala || NEAT || HIL3:2 || align=right | 10 km || 
|-id=160 bgcolor=#d6d6d6
| 242160 ||  || — || March 23, 2003 || Kitt Peak || Spacewatch || — || align=right | 5.7 km || 
|-id=161 bgcolor=#d6d6d6
| 242161 ||  || — || March 23, 2003 || Kitt Peak || Spacewatch || — || align=right | 5.8 km || 
|-id=162 bgcolor=#fefefe
| 242162 ||  || — || March 28, 2003 || Kitt Peak || Spacewatch || — || align=right data-sort-value="0.98" | 980 m || 
|-id=163 bgcolor=#E9E9E9
| 242163 ||  || — || March 29, 2003 || Anderson Mesa || LONEOS || — || align=right | 3.4 km || 
|-id=164 bgcolor=#d6d6d6
| 242164 ||  || — || March 30, 2003 || Kitt Peak || Spacewatch || EOS || align=right | 3.8 km || 
|-id=165 bgcolor=#fefefe
| 242165 ||  || — || March 31, 2003 || Anderson Mesa || LONEOS || FLO || align=right | 1.5 km || 
|-id=166 bgcolor=#E9E9E9
| 242166 ||  || — || March 24, 2003 || Kitt Peak || Spacewatch || KON || align=right | 2.9 km || 
|-id=167 bgcolor=#fefefe
| 242167 ||  || — || March 29, 2003 || Anderson Mesa || LONEOS || — || align=right data-sort-value="0.92" | 920 m || 
|-id=168 bgcolor=#fefefe
| 242168 ||  || — || April 1, 2003 || Socorro || LINEAR || FLO || align=right | 1.5 km || 
|-id=169 bgcolor=#fefefe
| 242169 ||  || — || April 5, 2003 || Haleakala || NEAT || — || align=right | 1.3 km || 
|-id=170 bgcolor=#fefefe
| 242170 ||  || — || April 9, 2003 || Kitt Peak || Spacewatch || — || align=right | 1.4 km || 
|-id=171 bgcolor=#d6d6d6
| 242171 ||  || — || April 8, 2003 || Haleakala || NEAT || EUP || align=right | 5.5 km || 
|-id=172 bgcolor=#fefefe
| 242172 ||  || — || April 12, 2003 || Uccle || T. Pauwels || — || align=right | 1.2 km || 
|-id=173 bgcolor=#fefefe
| 242173 ||  || — || April 7, 2003 || Socorro || LINEAR || — || align=right data-sort-value="0.81" | 810 m || 
|-id=174 bgcolor=#d6d6d6
| 242174 ||  || — || April 25, 2003 || Socorro || LINEAR || EUP || align=right | 7.3 km || 
|-id=175 bgcolor=#fefefe
| 242175 ||  || — || April 26, 2003 || Haleakala || NEAT || — || align=right data-sort-value="0.83" | 830 m || 
|-id=176 bgcolor=#E9E9E9
| 242176 ||  || — || April 26, 2003 || Haleakala || NEAT || — || align=right | 3.6 km || 
|-id=177 bgcolor=#C2FFFF
| 242177 ||  || — || April 25, 2003 || Kitt Peak || Spacewatch || L4 || align=right | 10 km || 
|-id=178 bgcolor=#d6d6d6
| 242178 ||  || — || April 28, 2003 || Socorro || LINEAR || HIL3:2 || align=right | 7.0 km || 
|-id=179 bgcolor=#fefefe
| 242179 ||  || — || April 27, 2003 || Anderson Mesa || LONEOS || V || align=right | 1.0 km || 
|-id=180 bgcolor=#fefefe
| 242180 ||  || — || April 28, 2003 || Socorro || LINEAR || — || align=right | 1.3 km || 
|-id=181 bgcolor=#fefefe
| 242181 ||  || — || April 29, 2003 || Kitt Peak || Spacewatch || FLO || align=right | 2.9 km || 
|-id=182 bgcolor=#fefefe
| 242182 ||  || — || April 29, 2003 || Anderson Mesa || LONEOS || — || align=right | 1.1 km || 
|-id=183 bgcolor=#d6d6d6
| 242183 ||  || — || April 24, 2003 || Anderson Mesa || LONEOS || — || align=right | 7.1 km || 
|-id=184 bgcolor=#E9E9E9
| 242184 ||  || — || April 25, 2003 || Campo Imperatore || CINEOS || — || align=right | 3.8 km || 
|-id=185 bgcolor=#E9E9E9
| 242185 ||  || — || May 1, 2003 || Kitt Peak || Spacewatch || — || align=right | 3.1 km || 
|-id=186 bgcolor=#fefefe
| 242186 ||  || — || May 25, 2003 || Reedy Creek || J. Broughton || — || align=right | 1.3 km || 
|-id=187 bgcolor=#FFC2E0
| 242187 ||  || — || May 30, 2003 || Socorro || LINEAR || AMO +1km || align=right data-sort-value="0.61" | 610 m || 
|-id=188 bgcolor=#FA8072
| 242188 ||  || — || June 25, 2003 || Palomar || NEAT || — || align=right | 1.2 km || 
|-id=189 bgcolor=#fefefe
| 242189 ||  || — || June 26, 2003 || Socorro || LINEAR || — || align=right | 1.8 km || 
|-id=190 bgcolor=#fefefe
| 242190 ||  || — || June 23, 2003 || Anderson Mesa || LONEOS || ERI || align=right | 2.6 km || 
|-id=191 bgcolor=#FFC2E0
| 242191 ||  || — || July 9, 2003 || Socorro || LINEAR || ATE || align=right data-sort-value="0.37" | 370 m || 
|-id=192 bgcolor=#fefefe
| 242192 ||  || — || July 1, 2003 || Socorro || LINEAR || — || align=right | 1.3 km || 
|-id=193 bgcolor=#d6d6d6
| 242193 ||  || — || July 21, 2003 || Campo Imperatore || CINEOS || — || align=right | 4.4 km || 
|-id=194 bgcolor=#E9E9E9
| 242194 ||  || — || July 30, 2003 || Campo Imperatore || CINEOS || KON || align=right | 4.0 km || 
|-id=195 bgcolor=#d6d6d6
| 242195 ||  || — || August 1, 2003 || Socorro || LINEAR || HYG || align=right | 5.0 km || 
|-id=196 bgcolor=#FA8072
| 242196 ||  || — || August 1, 2003 || Socorro || LINEAR || — || align=right | 1.9 km || 
|-id=197 bgcolor=#d6d6d6
| 242197 ||  || — || August 4, 2003 || Needville || J. Dellinger || — || align=right | 3.6 km || 
|-id=198 bgcolor=#fefefe
| 242198 ||  || — || August 22, 2003 || Haleakala || NEAT || — || align=right | 1.2 km || 
|-id=199 bgcolor=#fefefe
| 242199 ||  || — || August 20, 2003 || Palomar || NEAT || — || align=right | 1.5 km || 
|-id=200 bgcolor=#fefefe
| 242200 ||  || — || August 22, 2003 || Socorro || LINEAR || NYS || align=right | 1.1 km || 
|}

242201–242300 

|-bgcolor=#d6d6d6
| 242201 ||  || — || August 22, 2003 || Socorro || LINEAR || — || align=right | 2.9 km || 
|-id=202 bgcolor=#fefefe
| 242202 ||  || — || August 22, 2003 || Palomar || NEAT || ERI || align=right | 2.4 km || 
|-id=203 bgcolor=#fefefe
| 242203 ||  || — || August 22, 2003 || Palomar || NEAT || — || align=right | 1.3 km || 
|-id=204 bgcolor=#fefefe
| 242204 ||  || — || August 22, 2003 || Campo Imperatore || CINEOS || — || align=right | 1.3 km || 
|-id=205 bgcolor=#fefefe
| 242205 ||  || — || August 21, 2003 || Palomar || NEAT || NYS || align=right data-sort-value="0.91" | 910 m || 
|-id=206 bgcolor=#fefefe
| 242206 ||  || — || August 22, 2003 || Socorro || LINEAR || FLO || align=right | 1.5 km || 
|-id=207 bgcolor=#fefefe
| 242207 ||  || — || August 22, 2003 || Socorro || LINEAR || — || align=right | 1.1 km || 
|-id=208 bgcolor=#fefefe
| 242208 ||  || — || August 25, 2003 || Socorro || LINEAR || — || align=right | 1.4 km || 
|-id=209 bgcolor=#fefefe
| 242209 ||  || — || August 23, 2003 || Palomar || NEAT || — || align=right | 1.5 km || 
|-id=210 bgcolor=#fefefe
| 242210 ||  || — || August 24, 2003 || Socorro || LINEAR || — || align=right | 1.7 km || 
|-id=211 bgcolor=#FFC2E0
| 242211 ||  || — || August 26, 2003 || Socorro || LINEAR || AMO +1km || align=right data-sort-value="0.86" | 860 m || 
|-id=212 bgcolor=#d6d6d6
| 242212 ||  || — || August 30, 2003 || Kitt Peak || Spacewatch || — || align=right | 7.3 km || 
|-id=213 bgcolor=#d6d6d6
| 242213 ||  || — || August 22, 2003 || Haleakala || NEAT || — || align=right | 5.8 km || 
|-id=214 bgcolor=#fefefe
| 242214 ||  || — || September 3, 2003 || Socorro || LINEAR || — || align=right | 1.5 km || 
|-id=215 bgcolor=#fefefe
| 242215 ||  || — || September 5, 2003 || Essen || T. Payer || — || align=right | 1.4 km || 
|-id=216 bgcolor=#FFC2E0
| 242216 ||  || — || September 13, 2003 || Anderson Mesa || LONEOS || AMO +1kmPHA || align=right | 2.6 km || 
|-id=217 bgcolor=#d6d6d6
| 242217 ||  || — || September 15, 2003 || Palomar || NEAT || CRO || align=right | 4.0 km || 
|-id=218 bgcolor=#E9E9E9
| 242218 ||  || — || September 14, 2003 || Haleakala || NEAT || — || align=right | 3.9 km || 
|-id=219 bgcolor=#fefefe
| 242219 ||  || — || September 15, 2003 || Palomar || NEAT || MAS || align=right data-sort-value="0.94" | 940 m || 
|-id=220 bgcolor=#d6d6d6
| 242220 ||  || — || September 15, 2003 || Anderson Mesa || LONEOS || EUP || align=right | 5.0 km || 
|-id=221 bgcolor=#fefefe
| 242221 ||  || — || September 16, 2003 || Palomar || NEAT || — || align=right | 2.1 km || 
|-id=222 bgcolor=#d6d6d6
| 242222 ||  || — || September 17, 2003 || Kitt Peak || Spacewatch || — || align=right | 3.0 km || 
|-id=223 bgcolor=#E9E9E9
| 242223 ||  || — || September 17, 2003 || Socorro || LINEAR || — || align=right | 3.0 km || 
|-id=224 bgcolor=#fefefe
| 242224 ||  || — || September 16, 2003 || Anderson Mesa || LONEOS || NYS || align=right data-sort-value="0.92" | 920 m || 
|-id=225 bgcolor=#d6d6d6
| 242225 ||  || — || September 18, 2003 || Palomar || NEAT || VER || align=right | 5.0 km || 
|-id=226 bgcolor=#fefefe
| 242226 ||  || — || September 18, 2003 || Kitt Peak || Spacewatch || FLO || align=right | 1.0 km || 
|-id=227 bgcolor=#fefefe
| 242227 ||  || — || September 19, 2003 || Kitt Peak || Spacewatch || — || align=right | 2.1 km || 
|-id=228 bgcolor=#d6d6d6
| 242228 ||  || — || September 19, 2003 || Haleakala || NEAT || — || align=right | 5.7 km || 
|-id=229 bgcolor=#fefefe
| 242229 ||  || — || September 17, 2003 || Haleakala || NEAT || V || align=right data-sort-value="0.95" | 950 m || 
|-id=230 bgcolor=#d6d6d6
| 242230 ||  || — || September 19, 2003 || Palomar || NEAT || — || align=right | 4.9 km || 
|-id=231 bgcolor=#E9E9E9
| 242231 ||  || — || September 20, 2003 || Kitt Peak || Spacewatch || — || align=right | 5.0 km || 
|-id=232 bgcolor=#E9E9E9
| 242232 ||  || — || September 16, 2003 || Palomar || NEAT || — || align=right | 4.2 km || 
|-id=233 bgcolor=#fefefe
| 242233 ||  || — || September 17, 2003 || Kitt Peak || Spacewatch || — || align=right data-sort-value="0.94" | 940 m || 
|-id=234 bgcolor=#E9E9E9
| 242234 ||  || — || September 20, 2003 || Črni Vrh || Črni Vrh || — || align=right | 4.2 km || 
|-id=235 bgcolor=#d6d6d6
| 242235 ||  || — || September 20, 2003 || Kleť || Kleť Obs. || — || align=right | 4.1 km || 
|-id=236 bgcolor=#E9E9E9
| 242236 ||  || — || September 19, 2003 || Campo Imperatore || CINEOS || — || align=right | 3.2 km || 
|-id=237 bgcolor=#fefefe
| 242237 ||  || — || September 16, 2003 || Kitt Peak || Spacewatch || NYS || align=right | 1.7 km || 
|-id=238 bgcolor=#d6d6d6
| 242238 ||  || — || September 20, 2003 || Socorro || LINEAR || — || align=right | 2.9 km || 
|-id=239 bgcolor=#E9E9E9
| 242239 ||  || — || September 20, 2003 || Anderson Mesa || LONEOS || NEM || align=right | 3.9 km || 
|-id=240 bgcolor=#d6d6d6
| 242240 ||  || — || September 18, 2003 || Socorro || LINEAR || EUP || align=right | 5.9 km || 
|-id=241 bgcolor=#d6d6d6
| 242241 ||  || — || September 19, 2003 || Palomar || NEAT || — || align=right | 3.6 km || 
|-id=242 bgcolor=#E9E9E9
| 242242 ||  || — || September 19, 2003 || Kitt Peak || Spacewatch || — || align=right | 1.7 km || 
|-id=243 bgcolor=#d6d6d6
| 242243 ||  || — || September 26, 2003 || Socorro || LINEAR || ALA || align=right | 4.6 km || 
|-id=244 bgcolor=#d6d6d6
| 242244 ||  || — || September 28, 2003 || Emerald Lane || L. Ball || — || align=right | 3.1 km || 
|-id=245 bgcolor=#d6d6d6
| 242245 ||  || — || September 27, 2003 || Kitt Peak || Spacewatch || ALA || align=right | 6.4 km || 
|-id=246 bgcolor=#fefefe
| 242246 ||  || — || September 28, 2003 || Desert Eagle || W. K. Y. Yeung || NYS || align=right | 2.5 km || 
|-id=247 bgcolor=#fefefe
| 242247 ||  || — || September 26, 2003 || Socorro || LINEAR || — || align=right | 2.3 km || 
|-id=248 bgcolor=#fefefe
| 242248 ||  || — || September 25, 2003 || Palomar || NEAT || — || align=right | 1.9 km || 
|-id=249 bgcolor=#fefefe
| 242249 ||  || — || September 26, 2003 || Socorro || LINEAR || — || align=right data-sort-value="0.96" | 960 m || 
|-id=250 bgcolor=#E9E9E9
| 242250 ||  || — || September 26, 2003 || Socorro || LINEAR || — || align=right | 3.2 km || 
|-id=251 bgcolor=#E9E9E9
| 242251 ||  || — || September 26, 2003 || Desert Eagle || W. K. Y. Yeung || 526 || align=right | 3.6 km || 
|-id=252 bgcolor=#fefefe
| 242252 ||  || — || September 28, 2003 || Kitt Peak || Spacewatch || EUT || align=right data-sort-value="0.95" | 950 m || 
|-id=253 bgcolor=#fefefe
| 242253 ||  || — || September 27, 2003 || Socorro || LINEAR || SUL || align=right | 2.8 km || 
|-id=254 bgcolor=#d6d6d6
| 242254 ||  || — || September 25, 2003 || Uccle || T. Pauwels || — || align=right | 6.5 km || 
|-id=255 bgcolor=#fefefe
| 242255 ||  || — || September 24, 2003 || Haleakala || NEAT || — || align=right | 1.2 km || 
|-id=256 bgcolor=#E9E9E9
| 242256 ||  || — || September 19, 2003 || Anderson Mesa || LONEOS || — || align=right | 1.5 km || 
|-id=257 bgcolor=#fefefe
| 242257 ||  || — || September 20, 2003 || Socorro || LINEAR || — || align=right | 1.3 km || 
|-id=258 bgcolor=#E9E9E9
| 242258 ||  || — || September 16, 2003 || Palomar || NEAT || — || align=right | 3.3 km || 
|-id=259 bgcolor=#E9E9E9
| 242259 ||  || — || September 18, 2003 || Haleakala || NEAT || EUN || align=right | 2.2 km || 
|-id=260 bgcolor=#E9E9E9
| 242260 ||  || — || September 17, 2003 || Palomar || NEAT || — || align=right | 3.8 km || 
|-id=261 bgcolor=#fefefe
| 242261 ||  || — || September 16, 2003 || Haleakala || NEAT || — || align=right | 1.3 km || 
|-id=262 bgcolor=#E9E9E9
| 242262 ||  || — || September 26, 2003 || Socorro || LINEAR || — || align=right | 2.8 km || 
|-id=263 bgcolor=#E9E9E9
| 242263 ||  || — || September 30, 2003 || Socorro || LINEAR || — || align=right | 4.8 km || 
|-id=264 bgcolor=#E9E9E9
| 242264 ||  || — || September 19, 2003 || Campo Imperatore || CINEOS || — || align=right | 1.3 km || 
|-id=265 bgcolor=#E9E9E9
| 242265 ||  || — || September 28, 2003 || Socorro || LINEAR || — || align=right | 2.1 km || 
|-id=266 bgcolor=#fefefe
| 242266 ||  || — || September 26, 2003 || Apache Point || SDSS || — || align=right | 1.4 km || 
|-id=267 bgcolor=#E9E9E9
| 242267 ||  || — || October 1, 2003 || Kitt Peak || Spacewatch || — || align=right | 2.7 km || 
|-id=268 bgcolor=#E9E9E9
| 242268 ||  || — || October 2, 2003 || Kitt Peak || Spacewatch || — || align=right | 2.9 km || 
|-id=269 bgcolor=#d6d6d6
| 242269 ||  || — || October 5, 2003 || Socorro || LINEAR || URS || align=right | 5.0 km || 
|-id=270 bgcolor=#d6d6d6
| 242270 ||  || — || October 5, 2003 || Kitt Peak || Spacewatch || — || align=right | 6.4 km || 
|-id=271 bgcolor=#fefefe
| 242271 ||  || — || October 21, 2003 || Socorro || LINEAR || H || align=right data-sort-value="0.97" | 970 m || 
|-id=272 bgcolor=#E9E9E9
| 242272 ||  || — || October 17, 2003 || Kitt Peak || Spacewatch || — || align=right | 2.1 km || 
|-id=273 bgcolor=#d6d6d6
| 242273 ||  || — || October 17, 2003 || Kitt Peak || Spacewatch || VER || align=right | 4.5 km || 
|-id=274 bgcolor=#E9E9E9
| 242274 ||  || — || October 18, 2003 || Palomar || NEAT || ADE || align=right | 4.4 km || 
|-id=275 bgcolor=#E9E9E9
| 242275 ||  || — || October 18, 2003 || Palomar || NEAT || — || align=right | 4.1 km || 
|-id=276 bgcolor=#E9E9E9
| 242276 ||  || — || October 16, 2003 || Anderson Mesa || LONEOS || BRU || align=right | 4.6 km || 
|-id=277 bgcolor=#d6d6d6
| 242277 ||  || — || October 16, 2003 || Palomar || NEAT || — || align=right | 4.3 km || 
|-id=278 bgcolor=#fefefe
| 242278 ||  || — || October 19, 2003 || Socorro || LINEAR || — || align=right | 3.5 km || 
|-id=279 bgcolor=#d6d6d6
| 242279 ||  || — || October 20, 2003 || Kitt Peak || Spacewatch || THM || align=right | 4.1 km || 
|-id=280 bgcolor=#E9E9E9
| 242280 ||  || — || October 19, 2003 || Palomar || NEAT || ADE || align=right | 3.0 km || 
|-id=281 bgcolor=#E9E9E9
| 242281 ||  || — || October 19, 2003 || Palomar || NEAT || DOR || align=right | 4.9 km || 
|-id=282 bgcolor=#E9E9E9
| 242282 ||  || — || October 20, 2003 || Palomar || NEAT || — || align=right | 2.3 km || 
|-id=283 bgcolor=#d6d6d6
| 242283 ||  || — || October 21, 2003 || Kitt Peak || Spacewatch || — || align=right | 4.1 km || 
|-id=284 bgcolor=#E9E9E9
| 242284 ||  || — || October 20, 2003 || Socorro || LINEAR || — || align=right | 4.5 km || 
|-id=285 bgcolor=#E9E9E9
| 242285 ||  || — || October 18, 2003 || Anderson Mesa || LONEOS || — || align=right | 3.3 km || 
|-id=286 bgcolor=#E9E9E9
| 242286 ||  || — || October 19, 2003 || Kitt Peak || Spacewatch || — || align=right | 1.6 km || 
|-id=287 bgcolor=#d6d6d6
| 242287 ||  || — || October 20, 2003 || Kitt Peak || Spacewatch || HYG || align=right | 3.7 km || 
|-id=288 bgcolor=#d6d6d6
| 242288 ||  || — || October 20, 2003 || Palomar || NEAT || VER || align=right | 4.0 km || 
|-id=289 bgcolor=#d6d6d6
| 242289 ||  || — || October 21, 2003 || Kitt Peak || Spacewatch || EUP || align=right | 6.8 km || 
|-id=290 bgcolor=#d6d6d6
| 242290 ||  || — || October 22, 2003 || Kitt Peak || Spacewatch || HIL3:2 || align=right | 7.9 km || 
|-id=291 bgcolor=#E9E9E9
| 242291 ||  || — || October 21, 2003 || Anderson Mesa || LONEOS || — || align=right | 1.2 km || 
|-id=292 bgcolor=#E9E9E9
| 242292 ||  || — || October 21, 2003 || Socorro || LINEAR || — || align=right | 1.6 km || 
|-id=293 bgcolor=#E9E9E9
| 242293 ||  || — || October 28, 2003 || Socorro || LINEAR || — || align=right | 2.9 km || 
|-id=294 bgcolor=#E9E9E9
| 242294 ||  || — || October 23, 2003 || Kitt Peak || M. W. Buie || — || align=right | 2.7 km || 
|-id=295 bgcolor=#d6d6d6
| 242295 ||  || — || October 16, 2003 || Kitt Peak || Spacewatch || — || align=right | 4.6 km || 
|-id=296 bgcolor=#E9E9E9
| 242296 ||  || — || October 16, 2003 || Kitt Peak || Spacewatch || HOF || align=right | 3.1 km || 
|-id=297 bgcolor=#d6d6d6
| 242297 ||  || — || October 19, 2003 || Apache Point || SDSS || — || align=right | 3.6 km || 
|-id=298 bgcolor=#E9E9E9
| 242298 ||  || — || October 19, 2003 || Apache Point || SDSS || AEO || align=right | 2.2 km || 
|-id=299 bgcolor=#E9E9E9
| 242299 ||  || — || October 22, 2003 || Apache Point || SDSS || — || align=right | 3.8 km || 
|-id=300 bgcolor=#d6d6d6
| 242300 ||  || — || November 19, 2003 || Palomar || NEAT || — || align=right | 3.4 km || 
|}

242301–242400 

|-bgcolor=#E9E9E9
| 242301 ||  || — || November 16, 2003 || Kitt Peak || Spacewatch || — || align=right | 4.1 km || 
|-id=302 bgcolor=#E9E9E9
| 242302 ||  || — || November 18, 2003 || Kitt Peak || Spacewatch || — || align=right | 2.9 km || 
|-id=303 bgcolor=#d6d6d6
| 242303 ||  || — || November 18, 2003 || Kitt Peak || Spacewatch || — || align=right | 4.8 km || 
|-id=304 bgcolor=#d6d6d6
| 242304 ||  || — || November 20, 2003 || Kitt Peak || Spacewatch || EUP || align=right | 6.0 km || 
|-id=305 bgcolor=#d6d6d6
| 242305 ||  || — || November 20, 2003 || Socorro || LINEAR || 3:2 || align=right | 5.8 km || 
|-id=306 bgcolor=#fefefe
| 242306 ||  || — || November 20, 2003 || Socorro || LINEAR || — || align=right | 2.4 km || 
|-id=307 bgcolor=#d6d6d6
| 242307 ||  || — || November 20, 2003 || Socorro || LINEAR || — || align=right | 2.9 km || 
|-id=308 bgcolor=#E9E9E9
| 242308 ||  || — || November 16, 2003 || Catalina || CSS || — || align=right | 2.1 km || 
|-id=309 bgcolor=#d6d6d6
| 242309 ||  || — || November 16, 2003 || Kitt Peak || Spacewatch || 3:2 || align=right | 7.1 km || 
|-id=310 bgcolor=#E9E9E9
| 242310 ||  || — || November 19, 2003 || Anderson Mesa || LONEOS || — || align=right | 3.1 km || 
|-id=311 bgcolor=#d6d6d6
| 242311 ||  || — || November 21, 2003 || Socorro || LINEAR || 3:2 || align=right | 5.8 km || 
|-id=312 bgcolor=#E9E9E9
| 242312 ||  || — || November 21, 2003 || Socorro || LINEAR || — || align=right | 4.2 km || 
|-id=313 bgcolor=#d6d6d6
| 242313 ||  || — || November 20, 2003 || Socorro || LINEAR || BRA || align=right | 2.9 km || 
|-id=314 bgcolor=#E9E9E9
| 242314 ||  || — || November 20, 2003 || Socorro || LINEAR || BRU || align=right | 4.1 km || 
|-id=315 bgcolor=#d6d6d6
| 242315 ||  || — || November 20, 2003 || Socorro || LINEAR || DUR || align=right | 5.4 km || 
|-id=316 bgcolor=#E9E9E9
| 242316 ||  || — || November 21, 2003 || Socorro || LINEAR || — || align=right | 1.7 km || 
|-id=317 bgcolor=#d6d6d6
| 242317 ||  || — || November 21, 2003 || Socorro || LINEAR || — || align=right | 5.5 km || 
|-id=318 bgcolor=#d6d6d6
| 242318 ||  || — || November 28, 2003 || Anderson Mesa || LONEOS || EUP || align=right | 7.7 km || 
|-id=319 bgcolor=#E9E9E9
| 242319 ||  || — || November 18, 2003 || Kitt Peak || Spacewatch || — || align=right | 1.7 km || 
|-id=320 bgcolor=#E9E9E9
| 242320 ||  || — || November 19, 2003 || Palomar || NEAT || — || align=right | 2.8 km || 
|-id=321 bgcolor=#d6d6d6
| 242321 ||  || — || November 20, 2003 || Catalina || CSS || 3:2 || align=right | 6.3 km || 
|-id=322 bgcolor=#E9E9E9
| 242322 ||  || — || November 30, 2003 || Kitt Peak || Spacewatch || KON || align=right | 3.1 km || 
|-id=323 bgcolor=#E9E9E9
| 242323 ||  || — || December 17, 2003 || Socorro || LINEAR || — || align=right | 2.2 km || 
|-id=324 bgcolor=#fefefe
| 242324 ||  || — || December 17, 2003 || Anderson Mesa || LONEOS || ERI || align=right | 2.5 km || 
|-id=325 bgcolor=#d6d6d6
| 242325 ||  || — || December 17, 2003 || Anderson Mesa || LONEOS || BRA || align=right | 2.2 km || 
|-id=326 bgcolor=#d6d6d6
| 242326 ||  || — || December 17, 2003 || Kitt Peak || Spacewatch || — || align=right | 4.4 km || 
|-id=327 bgcolor=#d6d6d6
| 242327 ||  || — || December 18, 2003 || Socorro || LINEAR || — || align=right | 2.2 km || 
|-id=328 bgcolor=#d6d6d6
| 242328 ||  || — || December 18, 2003 || Socorro || LINEAR || — || align=right | 5.6 km || 
|-id=329 bgcolor=#E9E9E9
| 242329 ||  || — || December 16, 2003 || Anderson Mesa || LONEOS || — || align=right | 3.5 km || 
|-id=330 bgcolor=#E9E9E9
| 242330 ||  || — || December 17, 2003 || Kitt Peak || Spacewatch || — || align=right | 3.0 km || 
|-id=331 bgcolor=#d6d6d6
| 242331 ||  || — || December 19, 2003 || Socorro || LINEAR || — || align=right | 3.2 km || 
|-id=332 bgcolor=#d6d6d6
| 242332 ||  || — || December 19, 2003 || Socorro || LINEAR || — || align=right | 3.1 km || 
|-id=333 bgcolor=#d6d6d6
| 242333 ||  || — || December 21, 2003 || Socorro || LINEAR || — || align=right | 6.7 km || 
|-id=334 bgcolor=#d6d6d6
| 242334 ||  || — || December 18, 2003 || Socorro || LINEAR || — || align=right | 5.3 km || 
|-id=335 bgcolor=#E9E9E9
| 242335 ||  || — || December 18, 2003 || Socorro || LINEAR || — || align=right | 2.5 km || 
|-id=336 bgcolor=#d6d6d6
| 242336 ||  || — || December 20, 2003 || Socorro || LINEAR || — || align=right | 5.6 km || 
|-id=337 bgcolor=#E9E9E9
| 242337 ||  || — || December 22, 2003 || Socorro || LINEAR || — || align=right | 3.2 km || 
|-id=338 bgcolor=#d6d6d6
| 242338 ||  || — || December 25, 2003 || Haleakala || NEAT || — || align=right | 4.0 km || 
|-id=339 bgcolor=#E9E9E9
| 242339 ||  || — || December 27, 2003 || Catalina || CSS || — || align=right | 4.2 km || 
|-id=340 bgcolor=#d6d6d6
| 242340 ||  || — || December 27, 2003 || Socorro || LINEAR || — || align=right | 3.7 km || 
|-id=341 bgcolor=#d6d6d6
| 242341 ||  || — || December 28, 2003 || Socorro || LINEAR || — || align=right | 5.6 km || 
|-id=342 bgcolor=#E9E9E9
| 242342 ||  || — || December 17, 2003 || Socorro || LINEAR || — || align=right | 2.9 km || 
|-id=343 bgcolor=#E9E9E9
| 242343 ||  || — || December 17, 2003 || Kitt Peak || Spacewatch || — || align=right | 3.2 km || 
|-id=344 bgcolor=#d6d6d6
| 242344 ||  || — || January 14, 2004 || Palomar || NEAT || EOS || align=right | 3.4 km || 
|-id=345 bgcolor=#d6d6d6
| 242345 ||  || — || January 15, 2004 || Kitt Peak || Spacewatch || — || align=right | 3.4 km || 
|-id=346 bgcolor=#d6d6d6
| 242346 ||  || — || January 16, 2004 || Palomar || NEAT || — || align=right | 5.4 km || 
|-id=347 bgcolor=#d6d6d6
| 242347 ||  || — || January 16, 2004 || Palomar || NEAT || HYG || align=right | 4.6 km || 
|-id=348 bgcolor=#d6d6d6
| 242348 ||  || — || January 19, 2004 || Anderson Mesa || LONEOS || — || align=right | 4.0 km || 
|-id=349 bgcolor=#d6d6d6
| 242349 ||  || — || January 19, 2004 || Kitt Peak || Spacewatch || — || align=right | 3.2 km || 
|-id=350 bgcolor=#E9E9E9
| 242350 ||  || — || January 20, 2004 || Socorro || LINEAR || RAF || align=right | 1.9 km || 
|-id=351 bgcolor=#E9E9E9
| 242351 ||  || — || January 22, 2004 || Socorro || LINEAR || — || align=right | 2.4 km || 
|-id=352 bgcolor=#d6d6d6
| 242352 ||  || — || January 23, 2004 || Socorro || LINEAR || LIX || align=right | 5.2 km || 
|-id=353 bgcolor=#d6d6d6
| 242353 ||  || — || January 28, 2004 || Socorro || LINEAR || EUP || align=right | 4.9 km || 
|-id=354 bgcolor=#d6d6d6
| 242354 ||  || — || January 28, 2004 || Catalina || CSS || — || align=right | 2.8 km || 
|-id=355 bgcolor=#d6d6d6
| 242355 ||  || — || January 28, 2004 || Catalina || CSS || — || align=right | 3.7 km || 
|-id=356 bgcolor=#E9E9E9
| 242356 ||  || — || January 23, 2004 || Socorro || LINEAR || — || align=right | 1.9 km || 
|-id=357 bgcolor=#d6d6d6
| 242357 ||  || — || January 27, 2004 || Kitt Peak || Spacewatch || — || align=right | 3.9 km || 
|-id=358 bgcolor=#d6d6d6
| 242358 ||  || — || January 29, 2004 || Anderson Mesa || LONEOS || — || align=right | 4.4 km || 
|-id=359 bgcolor=#E9E9E9
| 242359 ||  || — || January 19, 2004 || Socorro || LINEAR || JUN || align=right | 2.1 km || 
|-id=360 bgcolor=#d6d6d6
| 242360 ||  || — || January 21, 2004 || Socorro || LINEAR || — || align=right | 4.3 km || 
|-id=361 bgcolor=#d6d6d6
| 242361 ||  || — || January 17, 2004 || Palomar || NEAT || — || align=right | 4.2 km || 
|-id=362 bgcolor=#d6d6d6
| 242362 ||  || — || January 17, 2004 || Haleakala || NEAT || EOS || align=right | 3.5 km || 
|-id=363 bgcolor=#d6d6d6
| 242363 ||  || — || February 11, 2004 || Palomar || NEAT || THM || align=right | 3.2 km || 
|-id=364 bgcolor=#E9E9E9
| 242364 ||  || — || February 11, 2004 || Anderson Mesa || LONEOS || — || align=right | 4.5 km || 
|-id=365 bgcolor=#d6d6d6
| 242365 ||  || — || February 11, 2004 || Palomar || NEAT || — || align=right | 3.3 km || 
|-id=366 bgcolor=#d6d6d6
| 242366 ||  || — || February 12, 2004 || Kitt Peak || Spacewatch || K-2 || align=right | 1.7 km || 
|-id=367 bgcolor=#d6d6d6
| 242367 ||  || — || February 12, 2004 || Kitt Peak || Spacewatch || — || align=right | 2.4 km || 
|-id=368 bgcolor=#d6d6d6
| 242368 ||  || — || February 12, 2004 || Kitt Peak || Spacewatch || — || align=right | 2.3 km || 
|-id=369 bgcolor=#fefefe
| 242369 ||  || — || February 11, 2004 || Anderson Mesa || LONEOS || — || align=right | 2.5 km || 
|-id=370 bgcolor=#d6d6d6
| 242370 ||  || — || February 11, 2004 || Palomar || NEAT || 3:2 || align=right | 7.4 km || 
|-id=371 bgcolor=#d6d6d6
| 242371 ||  || — || February 12, 2004 || Kitt Peak || Spacewatch || — || align=right | 6.7 km || 
|-id=372 bgcolor=#d6d6d6
| 242372 ||  || — || February 11, 2004 || Palomar || NEAT || — || align=right | 5.9 km || 
|-id=373 bgcolor=#d6d6d6
| 242373 ||  || — || February 12, 2004 || Palomar || NEAT || EUP || align=right | 5.7 km || 
|-id=374 bgcolor=#d6d6d6
| 242374 ||  || — || February 14, 2004 || Kitt Peak || Spacewatch || LIX || align=right | 3.5 km || 
|-id=375 bgcolor=#d6d6d6
| 242375 ||  || — || February 12, 2004 || Kitt Peak || Spacewatch || — || align=right | 4.1 km || 
|-id=376 bgcolor=#d6d6d6
| 242376 ||  || — || February 17, 2004 || Socorro || LINEAR || — || align=right | 3.6 km || 
|-id=377 bgcolor=#fefefe
| 242377 ||  || — || February 19, 2004 || Socorro || LINEAR || KLI || align=right | 3.0 km || 
|-id=378 bgcolor=#d6d6d6
| 242378 ||  || — || February 22, 2004 || Kitt Peak || Spacewatch || EOS || align=right | 4.1 km || 
|-id=379 bgcolor=#d6d6d6
| 242379 ||  || — || February 20, 2004 || Haleakala || NEAT || LIX || align=right | 4.7 km || 
|-id=380 bgcolor=#d6d6d6
| 242380 ||  || — || February 23, 2004 || Socorro || LINEAR || — || align=right | 4.2 km || 
|-id=381 bgcolor=#d6d6d6
| 242381 ||  || — || February 23, 2004 || Socorro || LINEAR || — || align=right | 3.7 km || 
|-id=382 bgcolor=#d6d6d6
| 242382 ||  || — || February 26, 2004 || Socorro || LINEAR || EUP || align=right | 6.4 km || 
|-id=383 bgcolor=#d6d6d6
| 242383 ||  || — || March 11, 2004 || Palomar || NEAT || — || align=right | 3.9 km || 
|-id=384 bgcolor=#d6d6d6
| 242384 ||  || — || March 12, 2004 || Palomar || NEAT || HYG || align=right | 5.2 km || 
|-id=385 bgcolor=#E9E9E9
| 242385 ||  || — || March 13, 2004 || Palomar || NEAT || — || align=right | 2.3 km || 
|-id=386 bgcolor=#E9E9E9
| 242386 ||  || — || March 12, 2004 || Palomar || NEAT || — || align=right | 3.1 km || 
|-id=387 bgcolor=#d6d6d6
| 242387 ||  || — || March 15, 2004 || Kitt Peak || Spacewatch || — || align=right | 5.5 km || 
|-id=388 bgcolor=#d6d6d6
| 242388 ||  || — || March 14, 2004 || Socorro || LINEAR || — || align=right | 5.1 km || 
|-id=389 bgcolor=#d6d6d6
| 242389 ||  || — || March 15, 2004 || Socorro || LINEAR || — || align=right | 3.7 km || 
|-id=390 bgcolor=#fefefe
| 242390 ||  || — || March 15, 2004 || Kitt Peak || Spacewatch || — || align=right | 1.7 km || 
|-id=391 bgcolor=#E9E9E9
| 242391 ||  || — || March 15, 2004 || Kitt Peak || Spacewatch || KON || align=right | 2.7 km || 
|-id=392 bgcolor=#d6d6d6
| 242392 ||  || — || March 16, 2004 || Socorro || LINEAR || — || align=right | 4.4 km || 
|-id=393 bgcolor=#d6d6d6
| 242393 ||  || — || March 26, 2004 || Kitt Peak || DLS || HYG || align=right | 4.9 km || 
|-id=394 bgcolor=#fefefe
| 242394 ||  || — || March 18, 2004 || Socorro || LINEAR || NYS || align=right | 2.6 km || 
|-id=395 bgcolor=#d6d6d6
| 242395 ||  || — || March 16, 2004 || Kitt Peak || Spacewatch || — || align=right | 4.4 km || 
|-id=396 bgcolor=#d6d6d6
| 242396 ||  || — || March 16, 2004 || Socorro || LINEAR || — || align=right | 4.4 km || 
|-id=397 bgcolor=#d6d6d6
| 242397 ||  || — || March 17, 2004 || Socorro || LINEAR || — || align=right | 5.0 km || 
|-id=398 bgcolor=#E9E9E9
| 242398 ||  || — || March 18, 2004 || Kitt Peak || Spacewatch || — || align=right | 3.7 km || 
|-id=399 bgcolor=#E9E9E9
| 242399 ||  || — || March 19, 2004 || Palomar || NEAT || — || align=right | 4.4 km || 
|-id=400 bgcolor=#d6d6d6
| 242400 ||  || — || March 23, 2004 || Socorro || LINEAR || EOS || align=right | 2.9 km || 
|}

242401–242500 

|-bgcolor=#d6d6d6
| 242401 ||  || — || March 23, 2004 || Socorro || LINEAR || EMA || align=right | 5.0 km || 
|-id=402 bgcolor=#d6d6d6
| 242402 ||  || — || March 23, 2004 || Socorro || LINEAR || — || align=right | 3.8 km || 
|-id=403 bgcolor=#d6d6d6
| 242403 ||  || — || March 26, 2004 || Catalina || CSS || — || align=right | 4.1 km || 
|-id=404 bgcolor=#d6d6d6
| 242404 ||  || — || March 26, 2004 || Socorro || LINEAR || — || align=right | 4.6 km || 
|-id=405 bgcolor=#d6d6d6
| 242405 ||  || — || March 28, 2004 || Socorro || LINEAR || TIR || align=right | 4.6 km || 
|-id=406 bgcolor=#d6d6d6
| 242406 ||  || — || March 16, 2004 || Palomar || NEAT || — || align=right | 5.2 km || 
|-id=407 bgcolor=#d6d6d6
| 242407 ||  || — || March 26, 2004 || Kitt Peak || Spacewatch || EUP || align=right | 4.7 km || 
|-id=408 bgcolor=#E9E9E9
| 242408 ||  || — || March 17, 2004 || Kitt Peak || Spacewatch || — || align=right | 4.4 km || 
|-id=409 bgcolor=#E9E9E9
| 242409 ||  || — || April 12, 2004 || Palomar || NEAT || — || align=right | 3.5 km || 
|-id=410 bgcolor=#d6d6d6
| 242410 ||  || — || April 12, 2004 || Catalina || CSS || EUP || align=right | 5.6 km || 
|-id=411 bgcolor=#d6d6d6
| 242411 ||  || — || April 11, 2004 || Palomar || NEAT || — || align=right | 3.6 km || 
|-id=412 bgcolor=#d6d6d6
| 242412 ||  || — || April 13, 2004 || Palomar || NEAT || — || align=right | 3.7 km || 
|-id=413 bgcolor=#d6d6d6
| 242413 ||  || — || April 14, 2004 || Socorro || LINEAR || EUP || align=right | 5.0 km || 
|-id=414 bgcolor=#d6d6d6
| 242414 ||  || — || April 14, 2004 || Socorro || LINEAR || — || align=right | 5.0 km || 
|-id=415 bgcolor=#d6d6d6
| 242415 ||  || — || April 14, 2004 || Goodricke-Pigott || V. Reddy || LIX || align=right | 4.3 km || 
|-id=416 bgcolor=#fefefe
| 242416 ||  || — || April 12, 2004 || Palomar || NEAT || ERI || align=right | 3.8 km || 
|-id=417 bgcolor=#E9E9E9
| 242417 ||  || — || April 14, 2004 || Anderson Mesa || LONEOS || MIT || align=right | 3.0 km || 
|-id=418 bgcolor=#d6d6d6
| 242418 ||  || — || April 11, 2004 || Bergisch Gladbach || W. Bickel || EOS || align=right | 2.7 km || 
|-id=419 bgcolor=#E9E9E9
| 242419 ||  || — || April 19, 2004 || Socorro || LINEAR || — || align=right | 3.6 km || 
|-id=420 bgcolor=#d6d6d6
| 242420 ||  || — || April 19, 2004 || Socorro || LINEAR || — || align=right | 4.7 km || 
|-id=421 bgcolor=#d6d6d6
| 242421 ||  || — || April 23, 2004 || Kitt Peak || Spacewatch || HYG || align=right | 3.3 km || 
|-id=422 bgcolor=#d6d6d6
| 242422 ||  || — || April 20, 2004 || Socorro || LINEAR || — || align=right | 4.0 km || 
|-id=423 bgcolor=#d6d6d6
| 242423 ||  || — || April 20, 2004 || Kitt Peak || Spacewatch || — || align=right | 4.6 km || 
|-id=424 bgcolor=#d6d6d6
| 242424 ||  || — || May 15, 2004 || Socorro || LINEAR || — || align=right | 2.6 km || 
|-id=425 bgcolor=#d6d6d6
| 242425 ||  || — || June 12, 2004 || Socorro || LINEAR || — || align=right | 7.5 km || 
|-id=426 bgcolor=#d6d6d6
| 242426 ||  || — || June 15, 2004 || Kitt Peak || Spacewatch || — || align=right | 3.8 km || 
|-id=427 bgcolor=#d6d6d6
| 242427 ||  || — || July 11, 2004 || Socorro || LINEAR || — || align=right | 5.0 km || 
|-id=428 bgcolor=#d6d6d6
| 242428 ||  || — || July 14, 2004 || Socorro || LINEAR || — || align=right | 5.0 km || 
|-id=429 bgcolor=#d6d6d6
| 242429 ||  || — || July 14, 2004 || Socorro || LINEAR || — || align=right | 5.6 km || 
|-id=430 bgcolor=#d6d6d6
| 242430 ||  || — || July 14, 2004 || Socorro || LINEAR || — || align=right | 5.3 km || 
|-id=431 bgcolor=#d6d6d6
| 242431 ||  || — || July 11, 2004 || Socorro || LINEAR || — || align=right | 5.3 km || 
|-id=432 bgcolor=#E9E9E9
| 242432 ||  || — || July 11, 2004 || Socorro || LINEAR || CLO || align=right | 2.4 km || 
|-id=433 bgcolor=#fefefe
| 242433 ||  || — || July 11, 2004 || Socorro || LINEAR || — || align=right | 1.4 km || 
|-id=434 bgcolor=#fefefe
| 242434 ||  || — || July 14, 2004 || Socorro || LINEAR || ERI || align=right | 3.5 km || 
|-id=435 bgcolor=#d6d6d6
| 242435 ||  || — || July 15, 2004 || Siding Spring || SSS || EUP || align=right | 6.4 km || 
|-id=436 bgcolor=#E9E9E9
| 242436 ||  || — || July 16, 2004 || Socorro || LINEAR || KRM || align=right | 3.5 km || 
|-id=437 bgcolor=#fefefe
| 242437 ||  || — || July 16, 2004 || Socorro || LINEAR || — || align=right | 2.8 km || 
|-id=438 bgcolor=#d6d6d6
| 242438 ||  || — || August 6, 2004 || Campo Imperatore || CINEOS || — || align=right | 6.0 km || 
|-id=439 bgcolor=#fefefe
| 242439 ||  || — || August 9, 2004 || Socorro || LINEAR || ERI || align=right | 2.8 km || 
|-id=440 bgcolor=#d6d6d6
| 242440 ||  || — || August 8, 2004 || Palomar || NEAT || — || align=right | 5.4 km || 
|-id=441 bgcolor=#E9E9E9
| 242441 ||  || — || August 8, 2004 || Socorro || LINEAR || — || align=right | 2.4 km || 
|-id=442 bgcolor=#fefefe
| 242442 ||  || — || August 9, 2004 || Socorro || LINEAR || — || align=right | 2.0 km || 
|-id=443 bgcolor=#E9E9E9
| 242443 ||  || — || August 9, 2004 || Socorro || LINEAR || HOF || align=right | 3.2 km || 
|-id=444 bgcolor=#d6d6d6
| 242444 ||  || — || August 6, 2004 || Palomar || NEAT || — || align=right | 5.3 km || 
|-id=445 bgcolor=#E9E9E9
| 242445 ||  || — || August 12, 2004 || Reedy Creek || J. Broughton || — || align=right | 3.4 km || 
|-id=446 bgcolor=#E9E9E9
| 242446 ||  || — || August 11, 2004 || Goodricke-Pigott || Goodricke-Pigott Obs. || — || align=right | 4.0 km || 
|-id=447 bgcolor=#E9E9E9
| 242447 ||  || — || August 14, 2004 || Campo Imperatore || CINEOS || — || align=right | 2.4 km || 
|-id=448 bgcolor=#fefefe
| 242448 ||  || — || August 12, 2004 || Socorro || LINEAR || FLO || align=right | 1.6 km || 
|-id=449 bgcolor=#fefefe
| 242449 ||  || — || August 16, 2004 || Palomar || NEAT || KLI || align=right | 3.6 km || 
|-id=450 bgcolor=#FFC2E0
| 242450 ||  || — || August 20, 2004 || Siding Spring || SSS || APO +1kmPHA || align=right | 2.9 km || 
|-id=451 bgcolor=#d6d6d6
| 242451 ||  || — || August 21, 2004 || Catalina || CSS || 3:2 || align=right | 6.6 km || 
|-id=452 bgcolor=#E9E9E9
| 242452 ||  || — || August 23, 2004 || Kitt Peak || Spacewatch || PAD || align=right | 3.0 km || 
|-id=453 bgcolor=#E9E9E9
| 242453 ||  || — || September 4, 2004 || Palomar || NEAT || DOR || align=right | 3.1 km || 
|-id=454 bgcolor=#E9E9E9
| 242454 ||  || — || September 7, 2004 || Socorro || LINEAR || — || align=right | 4.0 km || 
|-id=455 bgcolor=#fefefe
| 242455 ||  || — || September 7, 2004 || Socorro || LINEAR || — || align=right | 2.4 km || 
|-id=456 bgcolor=#E9E9E9
| 242456 ||  || — || September 8, 2004 || Socorro || LINEAR || — || align=right | 2.1 km || 
|-id=457 bgcolor=#E9E9E9
| 242457 ||  || — || September 8, 2004 || Socorro || LINEAR || DOR || align=right | 3.6 km || 
|-id=458 bgcolor=#E9E9E9
| 242458 ||  || — || September 10, 2004 || Socorro || LINEAR || — || align=right | 2.7 km || 
|-id=459 bgcolor=#d6d6d6
| 242459 ||  || — || September 10, 2004 || Socorro || LINEAR || 7:4 || align=right | 6.0 km || 
|-id=460 bgcolor=#E9E9E9
| 242460 ||  || — || September 10, 2004 || Socorro || LINEAR || — || align=right | 2.8 km || 
|-id=461 bgcolor=#fefefe
| 242461 ||  || — || September 10, 2004 || Socorro || LINEAR || — || align=right | 1.3 km || 
|-id=462 bgcolor=#fefefe
| 242462 ||  || — || September 9, 2004 || Kitt Peak || Spacewatch || — || align=right | 1.2 km || 
|-id=463 bgcolor=#E9E9E9
| 242463 ||  || — || September 10, 2004 || Socorro || LINEAR || MIT || align=right | 2.7 km || 
|-id=464 bgcolor=#FA8072
| 242464 ||  || — || September 10, 2004 || Socorro || LINEAR || — || align=right data-sort-value="0.85" | 850 m || 
|-id=465 bgcolor=#fefefe
| 242465 ||  || — || September 10, 2004 || Kitt Peak || Spacewatch || NYS || align=right | 2.2 km || 
|-id=466 bgcolor=#fefefe
| 242466 ||  || — || September 13, 2004 || Socorro || LINEAR || V || align=right | 1.1 km || 
|-id=467 bgcolor=#E9E9E9
| 242467 ||  || — || September 4, 2004 || Palomar || NEAT || HOF || align=right | 4.3 km || 
|-id=468 bgcolor=#E9E9E9
| 242468 ||  || — || September 17, 2004 || Piszkéstető || K. Sárneczky || — || align=right | 2.2 km || 
|-id=469 bgcolor=#E9E9E9
| 242469 ||  || — || September 18, 2004 || Socorro || LINEAR || NEM || align=right | 3.1 km || 
|-id=470 bgcolor=#E9E9E9
| 242470 ||  || — || September 18, 2004 || Socorro || LINEAR || — || align=right | 3.1 km || 
|-id=471 bgcolor=#fefefe
| 242471 ||  || — || September 22, 2004 || Socorro || LINEAR || — || align=right data-sort-value="0.93" | 930 m || 
|-id=472 bgcolor=#E9E9E9
| 242472 ||  || — || September 16, 2004 || Kitt Peak || Spacewatch || — || align=right | 2.6 km || 
|-id=473 bgcolor=#d6d6d6
| 242473 ||  || — || October 4, 2004 || Kitt Peak || Spacewatch || 7:4 || align=right | 3.9 km || 
|-id=474 bgcolor=#fefefe
| 242474 ||  || — || October 4, 2004 || Kitt Peak || Spacewatch || — || align=right | 2.5 km || 
|-id=475 bgcolor=#fefefe
| 242475 ||  || — || October 4, 2004 || Kitt Peak || Spacewatch || — || align=right | 1.1 km || 
|-id=476 bgcolor=#fefefe
| 242476 ||  || — || October 4, 2004 || Kitt Peak || Spacewatch || FLO || align=right data-sort-value="0.72" | 720 m || 
|-id=477 bgcolor=#E9E9E9
| 242477 ||  || — || October 4, 2004 || Kitt Peak || Spacewatch || KON || align=right | 3.3 km || 
|-id=478 bgcolor=#fefefe
| 242478 ||  || — || October 5, 2004 || Kitt Peak || Spacewatch || — || align=right data-sort-value="0.84" | 840 m || 
|-id=479 bgcolor=#fefefe
| 242479 Marijampole ||  ||  || October 12, 2004 || Moletai || K. Černis, J. Zdanavičius || — || align=right | 1.3 km || 
|-id=480 bgcolor=#E9E9E9
| 242480 ||  || — || October 6, 2004 || Kitt Peak || Spacewatch || ADE || align=right | 3.2 km || 
|-id=481 bgcolor=#d6d6d6
| 242481 ||  || — || October 7, 2004 || Palomar || NEAT || ULA7:4 || align=right | 9.9 km || 
|-id=482 bgcolor=#fefefe
| 242482 ||  || — || October 9, 2004 || Kitt Peak || Spacewatch || — || align=right | 1.0 km || 
|-id=483 bgcolor=#E9E9E9
| 242483 ||  || — || October 10, 2004 || Socorro || LINEAR || — || align=right | 2.9 km || 
|-id=484 bgcolor=#d6d6d6
| 242484 ||  || — || October 11, 2004 || Kitt Peak || Spacewatch || — || align=right | 5.1 km || 
|-id=485 bgcolor=#fefefe
| 242485 ||  || — || October 13, 2004 || Kitt Peak || Spacewatch || — || align=right | 1.2 km || 
|-id=486 bgcolor=#fefefe
| 242486 ||  || — || October 21, 2004 || Socorro || LINEAR || V || align=right data-sort-value="0.98" | 980 m || 
|-id=487 bgcolor=#fefefe
| 242487 ||  || — || November 3, 2004 || Anderson Mesa || LONEOS || — || align=right | 1.4 km || 
|-id=488 bgcolor=#E9E9E9
| 242488 ||  || — || November 7, 2004 || Antares || ARO || — || align=right | 2.4 km || 
|-id=489 bgcolor=#fefefe
| 242489 ||  || — || November 4, 2004 || Catalina || CSS || — || align=right | 1.1 km || 
|-id=490 bgcolor=#fefefe
| 242490 ||  || — || November 7, 2004 || Socorro || LINEAR || — || align=right | 1.4 km || 
|-id=491 bgcolor=#fefefe
| 242491 ||  || — || November 14, 2004 || Cordell-Lorenz || D. T. Durig || NYS || align=right | 3.1 km || 
|-id=492 bgcolor=#E9E9E9
| 242492 Fantomas ||  ||  || November 10, 2004 || Nogales || M. Ory || — || align=right | 2.3 km || 
|-id=493 bgcolor=#d6d6d6
| 242493 ||  || — || November 22, 2004 || Siding Spring || R. H. McNaught || — || align=right | 3.2 km || 
|-id=494 bgcolor=#fefefe
| 242494 ||  || — || December 2, 2004 || Socorro || LINEAR || PHO || align=right | 4.1 km || 
|-id=495 bgcolor=#fefefe
| 242495 ||  || — || December 2, 2004 || Palomar || NEAT || FLO || align=right | 1.0 km || 
|-id=496 bgcolor=#E9E9E9
| 242496 ||  || — || December 8, 2004 || Socorro || LINEAR || KRM || align=right | 3.3 km || 
|-id=497 bgcolor=#d6d6d6
| 242497 ||  || — || December 8, 2004 || Socorro || LINEAR || — || align=right | 3.3 km || 
|-id=498 bgcolor=#E9E9E9
| 242498 ||  || — || December 9, 2004 || Catalina || CSS || EUN || align=right | 3.2 km || 
|-id=499 bgcolor=#E9E9E9
| 242499 ||  || — || December 10, 2004 || Socorro || LINEAR || — || align=right | 3.3 km || 
|-id=500 bgcolor=#d6d6d6
| 242500 ||  || — || December 10, 2004 || Socorro || LINEAR || ALA || align=right | 8.0 km || 
|}

242501–242600 

|-bgcolor=#E9E9E9
| 242501 ||  || — || December 7, 2004 || Socorro || LINEAR || — || align=right | 1.4 km || 
|-id=502 bgcolor=#fefefe
| 242502 ||  || — || December 12, 2004 || Kitt Peak || Spacewatch || FLO || align=right | 1.1 km || 
|-id=503 bgcolor=#d6d6d6
| 242503 ||  || — || December 10, 2004 || Kitt Peak || Spacewatch || HYG || align=right | 2.9 km || 
|-id=504 bgcolor=#E9E9E9
| 242504 ||  || — || December 10, 2004 || Socorro || LINEAR || — || align=right | 1.3 km || 
|-id=505 bgcolor=#E9E9E9
| 242505 ||  || — || December 12, 2004 || Jarnac || Jarnac Obs. || — || align=right | 2.6 km || 
|-id=506 bgcolor=#d6d6d6
| 242506 ||  || — || December 13, 2004 || Kitt Peak || Spacewatch || TIR || align=right | 3.2 km || 
|-id=507 bgcolor=#fefefe
| 242507 ||  || — || December 11, 2004 || Kitt Peak || Spacewatch || MAS || align=right | 1.2 km || 
|-id=508 bgcolor=#d6d6d6
| 242508 ||  || — || December 12, 2004 || Kitt Peak || Spacewatch || — || align=right | 6.4 km || 
|-id=509 bgcolor=#d6d6d6
| 242509 ||  || — || December 11, 2004 || Catalina || CSS || — || align=right | 4.9 km || 
|-id=510 bgcolor=#E9E9E9
| 242510 ||  || — || December 15, 2004 || Socorro || LINEAR || — || align=right | 4.3 km || 
|-id=511 bgcolor=#E9E9E9
| 242511 ||  || — || December 10, 2004 || Kitt Peak || Spacewatch || — || align=right | 2.6 km || 
|-id=512 bgcolor=#E9E9E9
| 242512 ||  || — || December 18, 2004 || Mount Lemmon || Mount Lemmon Survey || — || align=right | 1.5 km || 
|-id=513 bgcolor=#E9E9E9
| 242513 ||  || — || December 18, 2004 || Mount Lemmon || Mount Lemmon Survey || MIS || align=right | 3.5 km || 
|-id=514 bgcolor=#d6d6d6
| 242514 ||  || — || December 16, 2004 || Socorro || LINEAR || — || align=right | 2.8 km || 
|-id=515 bgcolor=#E9E9E9
| 242515 ||  || — || December 31, 2004 || Junk Bond || Junk Bond Obs. || — || align=right | 2.8 km || 
|-id=516 bgcolor=#E9E9E9
| 242516 Lindseystirling || 2005 AW ||  || January 4, 2005 || Vicques || M. Ory || NEM || align=right | 2.7 km || 
|-id=517 bgcolor=#E9E9E9
| 242517 ||  || — || January 1, 2005 || Catalina || CSS || — || align=right | 3.3 km || 
|-id=518 bgcolor=#d6d6d6
| 242518 ||  || — || January 6, 2005 || Socorro || LINEAR || EUP || align=right | 4.9 km || 
|-id=519 bgcolor=#E9E9E9
| 242519 ||  || — || January 6, 2005 || Catalina || CSS || — || align=right | 3.3 km || 
|-id=520 bgcolor=#E9E9E9
| 242520 ||  || — || January 6, 2005 || Catalina || CSS || PAE || align=right | 3.3 km || 
|-id=521 bgcolor=#E9E9E9
| 242521 ||  || — || January 7, 2005 || Catalina || CSS || — || align=right | 2.3 km || 
|-id=522 bgcolor=#d6d6d6
| 242522 ||  || — || January 7, 2005 || Catalina || CSS || — || align=right | 4.9 km || 
|-id=523 bgcolor=#E9E9E9
| 242523 Kreszgéza ||  ||  || January 5, 2005 || Piszkéstető || K. Sárneczky || — || align=right | 2.5 km || 
|-id=524 bgcolor=#fefefe
| 242524 ||  || — || January 6, 2005 || Catalina || CSS || — || align=right | 3.4 km || 
|-id=525 bgcolor=#E9E9E9
| 242525 ||  || — || January 7, 2005 || Socorro || LINEAR || — || align=right | 2.8 km || 
|-id=526 bgcolor=#E9E9E9
| 242526 ||  || — || January 9, 2005 || Catalina || CSS || — || align=right | 2.9 km || 
|-id=527 bgcolor=#E9E9E9
| 242527 ||  || — || January 13, 2005 || Kitt Peak || Spacewatch || — || align=right | 1.5 km || 
|-id=528 bgcolor=#E9E9E9
| 242528 ||  || — || January 13, 2005 || Kitt Peak || Spacewatch || — || align=right | 2.1 km || 
|-id=529 bgcolor=#E9E9E9
| 242529 Hilaomar ||  ||  || January 13, 2005 || Vicques || M. Ory || — || align=right | 3.8 km || 
|-id=530 bgcolor=#E9E9E9
| 242530 ||  || — || January 15, 2005 || Socorro || LINEAR || — || align=right | 2.5 km || 
|-id=531 bgcolor=#E9E9E9
| 242531 ||  || — || January 15, 2005 || Socorro || LINEAR || — || align=right | 3.8 km || 
|-id=532 bgcolor=#fefefe
| 242532 ||  || — || January 15, 2005 || Socorro || LINEAR || — || align=right | 1.4 km || 
|-id=533 bgcolor=#E9E9E9
| 242533 ||  || — || January 15, 2005 || Kitt Peak || Spacewatch || HOF || align=right | 3.2 km || 
|-id=534 bgcolor=#E9E9E9
| 242534 ||  || — || January 15, 2005 || Kitt Peak || Spacewatch || — || align=right | 2.5 km || 
|-id=535 bgcolor=#E9E9E9
| 242535 ||  || — || January 16, 2005 || Desert Eagle || W. K. Y. Yeung || MIS || align=right | 3.0 km || 
|-id=536 bgcolor=#E9E9E9
| 242536 ||  || — || January 16, 2005 || Socorro || LINEAR || — || align=right | 2.7 km || 
|-id=537 bgcolor=#E9E9E9
| 242537 ||  || — || January 17, 2005 || Kitt Peak || Spacewatch || — || align=right | 2.0 km || 
|-id=538 bgcolor=#d6d6d6
| 242538 ||  || — || January 17, 2005 || La Silla || A. Boattini, H. Scholl || — || align=right | 4.5 km || 
|-id=539 bgcolor=#E9E9E9
| 242539 ||  || — || February 1, 2005 || Palomar || NEAT || — || align=right | 4.4 km || 
|-id=540 bgcolor=#E9E9E9
| 242540 ||  || — || February 1, 2005 || Palomar || NEAT || — || align=right | 2.1 km || 
|-id=541 bgcolor=#E9E9E9
| 242541 ||  || — || February 9, 2005 || Anderson Mesa || LONEOS || RAF || align=right | 1.4 km || 
|-id=542 bgcolor=#d6d6d6
| 242542 ||  || — || February 9, 2005 || Anderson Mesa || LONEOS || — || align=right | 2.6 km || 
|-id=543 bgcolor=#fefefe
| 242543 ||  || — || February 2, 2005 || Catalina || CSS || — || align=right | 2.3 km || 
|-id=544 bgcolor=#E9E9E9
| 242544 ||  || — || February 3, 2005 || Anderson Mesa || LONEOS || DOR || align=right | 4.0 km || 
|-id=545 bgcolor=#E9E9E9
| 242545 ||  || — || February 28, 2005 || Socorro || LINEAR || — || align=right | 3.2 km || 
|-id=546 bgcolor=#E9E9E9
| 242546 ||  || — || March 2, 2005 || Catalina || CSS || XIZ || align=right | 1.7 km || 
|-id=547 bgcolor=#E9E9E9
| 242547 ||  || — || March 3, 2005 || Catalina || CSS || — || align=right | 2.2 km || 
|-id=548 bgcolor=#E9E9E9
| 242548 ||  || — || March 4, 2005 || Catalina || CSS || — || align=right | 2.4 km || 
|-id=549 bgcolor=#E9E9E9
| 242549 ||  || — || March 4, 2005 || Catalina || CSS || CLO || align=right | 3.5 km || 
|-id=550 bgcolor=#E9E9E9
| 242550 ||  || — || March 3, 2005 || Catalina || CSS || — || align=right | 2.6 km || 
|-id=551 bgcolor=#fefefe
| 242551 ||  || — || March 3, 2005 || Catalina || CSS || ERI || align=right | 2.7 km || 
|-id=552 bgcolor=#E9E9E9
| 242552 ||  || — || March 8, 2005 || Mount Lemmon || Mount Lemmon Survey || — || align=right | 1.5 km || 
|-id=553 bgcolor=#E9E9E9
| 242553 ||  || — || March 8, 2005 || Socorro || LINEAR || — || align=right | 2.1 km || 
|-id=554 bgcolor=#E9E9E9
| 242554 ||  || — || March 4, 2005 || Socorro || LINEAR || — || align=right | 5.1 km || 
|-id=555 bgcolor=#E9E9E9
| 242555 ||  || — || March 7, 2005 || Socorro || LINEAR || — || align=right | 3.2 km || 
|-id=556 bgcolor=#E9E9E9
| 242556 ||  || — || March 8, 2005 || Kitt Peak || Spacewatch || — || align=right | 1.9 km || 
|-id=557 bgcolor=#fefefe
| 242557 ||  || — || March 9, 2005 || Kitt Peak || Spacewatch || — || align=right | 1.2 km || 
|-id=558 bgcolor=#d6d6d6
| 242558 ||  || — || March 9, 2005 || Mount Lemmon || Mount Lemmon Survey || — || align=right | 4.9 km || 
|-id=559 bgcolor=#E9E9E9
| 242559 ||  || — || March 10, 2005 || Mount Lemmon || Mount Lemmon Survey || — || align=right | 1.9 km || 
|-id=560 bgcolor=#d6d6d6
| 242560 ||  || — || March 9, 2005 || Mount Lemmon || Mount Lemmon Survey || — || align=right | 2.6 km || 
|-id=561 bgcolor=#E9E9E9
| 242561 ||  || — || March 11, 2005 || Mount Lemmon || Mount Lemmon Survey || — || align=right | 2.4 km || 
|-id=562 bgcolor=#d6d6d6
| 242562 ||  || — || March 8, 2005 || Mount Lemmon || Mount Lemmon Survey || — || align=right | 4.7 km || 
|-id=563 bgcolor=#E9E9E9
| 242563 ||  || — || March 9, 2005 || Socorro || LINEAR || — || align=right | 2.9 km || 
|-id=564 bgcolor=#E9E9E9
| 242564 ||  || — || March 9, 2005 || Kitt Peak || Spacewatch || — || align=right | 2.7 km || 
|-id=565 bgcolor=#d6d6d6
| 242565 ||  || — || March 8, 2005 || Anderson Mesa || LONEOS || DUR || align=right | 4.2 km || 
|-id=566 bgcolor=#E9E9E9
| 242566 ||  || — || March 4, 2005 || Kitt Peak || Spacewatch || — || align=right | 2.0 km || 
|-id=567 bgcolor=#E9E9E9
| 242567 ||  || — || March 4, 2005 || Catalina || CSS || GAL || align=right | 2.1 km || 
|-id=568 bgcolor=#d6d6d6
| 242568 ||  || — || March 12, 2005 || Kitt Peak || Spacewatch || — || align=right | 3.1 km || 
|-id=569 bgcolor=#d6d6d6
| 242569 ||  || — || March 10, 2005 || Mount Lemmon || Mount Lemmon Survey || — || align=right | 2.0 km || 
|-id=570 bgcolor=#E9E9E9
| 242570 ||  || — || March 13, 2005 || Kitt Peak || Spacewatch || — || align=right | 1.9 km || 
|-id=571 bgcolor=#d6d6d6
| 242571 ||  || — || March 4, 2005 || Catalina || CSS || NAE || align=right | 5.1 km || 
|-id=572 bgcolor=#E9E9E9
| 242572 ||  || — || April 2, 2005 || Needville || Needville Obs. || — || align=right | 3.2 km || 
|-id=573 bgcolor=#E9E9E9
| 242573 ||  || — || April 1, 2005 || Anderson Mesa || LONEOS || — || align=right | 1.8 km || 
|-id=574 bgcolor=#E9E9E9
| 242574 ||  || — || April 4, 2005 || Catalina || CSS || PAE || align=right | 3.9 km || 
|-id=575 bgcolor=#E9E9E9
| 242575 ||  || — || April 2, 2005 || Mount Lemmon || Mount Lemmon Survey || MRX || align=right | 1.2 km || 
|-id=576 bgcolor=#d6d6d6
| 242576 ||  || — || April 3, 2005 || Siding Spring || SSS || — || align=right | 6.3 km || 
|-id=577 bgcolor=#E9E9E9
| 242577 ||  || — || April 1, 2005 || Anderson Mesa || LONEOS || MIT || align=right | 2.6 km || 
|-id=578 bgcolor=#E9E9E9
| 242578 ||  || — || April 5, 2005 || Palomar || NEAT || — || align=right | 3.3 km || 
|-id=579 bgcolor=#d6d6d6
| 242579 ||  || — || April 2, 2005 || Kitt Peak || Spacewatch || — || align=right | 3.0 km || 
|-id=580 bgcolor=#E9E9E9
| 242580 ||  || — || April 5, 2005 || Mount Lemmon || Mount Lemmon Survey || BAR || align=right | 1.4 km || 
|-id=581 bgcolor=#E9E9E9
| 242581 ||  || — || April 11, 2005 || Mount Lemmon || Mount Lemmon Survey || — || align=right | 2.5 km || 
|-id=582 bgcolor=#E9E9E9
| 242582 ||  || — || April 7, 2005 || Palomar || NEAT || KON || align=right | 4.1 km || 
|-id=583 bgcolor=#E9E9E9
| 242583 ||  || — || April 10, 2005 || Kitt Peak || Spacewatch || HOF || align=right | 3.2 km || 
|-id=584 bgcolor=#d6d6d6
| 242584 ||  || — || April 12, 2005 || Kitt Peak || Spacewatch || — || align=right | 3.7 km || 
|-id=585 bgcolor=#d6d6d6
| 242585 ||  || — || April 11, 2005 || Kitt Peak || Spacewatch || — || align=right | 4.5 km || 
|-id=586 bgcolor=#E9E9E9
| 242586 ||  || — || April 11, 2005 || Kitt Peak || Spacewatch || ADE || align=right | 2.4 km || 
|-id=587 bgcolor=#d6d6d6
| 242587 ||  || — || April 9, 2005 || Socorro || LINEAR || HYG || align=right | 3.5 km || 
|-id=588 bgcolor=#E9E9E9
| 242588 ||  || — || April 14, 2005 || Kitt Peak || Spacewatch || — || align=right | 3.5 km || 
|-id=589 bgcolor=#d6d6d6
| 242589 ||  || — || April 4, 2005 || Catalina || CSS || ALA || align=right | 5.2 km || 
|-id=590 bgcolor=#d6d6d6
| 242590 ||  || — || April 6, 2005 || Anderson Mesa || LONEOS || — || align=right | 3.7 km || 
|-id=591 bgcolor=#E9E9E9
| 242591 ||  || — || April 16, 2005 || Kitt Peak || Spacewatch || — || align=right | 1.7 km || 
|-id=592 bgcolor=#d6d6d6
| 242592 ||  || — || April 16, 2005 || Kitt Peak || Spacewatch || ALA || align=right | 3.8 km || 
|-id=593 bgcolor=#E9E9E9
| 242593 ||  || — || May 4, 2005 || Mauna Kea || C. Veillet || AGN || align=right | 1.6 km || 
|-id=594 bgcolor=#d6d6d6
| 242594 ||  || — || May 4, 2005 || Catalina || CSS || — || align=right | 4.1 km || 
|-id=595 bgcolor=#d6d6d6
| 242595 ||  || — || May 3, 2005 || Kitt Peak || Spacewatch || — || align=right | 6.0 km || 
|-id=596 bgcolor=#d6d6d6
| 242596 ||  || — || May 3, 2005 || Catalina || CSS || EUP || align=right | 4.5 km || 
|-id=597 bgcolor=#C2FFFF
| 242597 ||  || — || May 3, 2005 || Kitt Peak || Spacewatch || L4 || align=right | 10 km || 
|-id=598 bgcolor=#d6d6d6
| 242598 ||  || — || May 4, 2005 || Kitt Peak || Spacewatch || EOS || align=right | 2.1 km || 
|-id=599 bgcolor=#d6d6d6
| 242599 ||  || — || May 2, 2005 || Kitt Peak || DLS || EUP || align=right | 5.9 km || 
|-id=600 bgcolor=#d6d6d6
| 242600 ||  || — || May 4, 2005 || Kitt Peak || Spacewatch || ALA || align=right | 4.3 km || 
|}

242601–242700 

|-bgcolor=#d6d6d6
| 242601 ||  || — || May 4, 2005 || Kitt Peak || Spacewatch || — || align=right | 4.6 km || 
|-id=602 bgcolor=#E9E9E9
| 242602 ||  || — || May 7, 2005 || Kitt Peak || Spacewatch || — || align=right | 2.3 km || 
|-id=603 bgcolor=#d6d6d6
| 242603 ||  || — || May 6, 2005 || Kitt Peak || Spacewatch || — || align=right | 4.1 km || 
|-id=604 bgcolor=#E9E9E9
| 242604 ||  || — || May 8, 2005 || Anderson Mesa || LONEOS || — || align=right | 4.0 km || 
|-id=605 bgcolor=#d6d6d6
| 242605 ||  || — || May 8, 2005 || Kitt Peak || Spacewatch || K-2 || align=right | 1.8 km || 
|-id=606 bgcolor=#E9E9E9
| 242606 ||  || — || May 10, 2005 || Anderson Mesa || LONEOS || — || align=right | 2.8 km || 
|-id=607 bgcolor=#E9E9E9
| 242607 ||  || — || May 9, 2005 || Catalina || CSS || — || align=right | 1.8 km || 
|-id=608 bgcolor=#d6d6d6
| 242608 ||  || — || May 11, 2005 || Palomar || NEAT || — || align=right | 5.4 km || 
|-id=609 bgcolor=#d6d6d6
| 242609 ||  || — || May 8, 2005 || Kitt Peak || Spacewatch || — || align=right | 3.9 km || 
|-id=610 bgcolor=#d6d6d6
| 242610 ||  || — || May 9, 2005 || Kitt Peak || Spacewatch || — || align=right | 4.6 km || 
|-id=611 bgcolor=#d6d6d6
| 242611 ||  || — || May 9, 2005 || Kitt Peak || Spacewatch || — || align=right | 4.6 km || 
|-id=612 bgcolor=#d6d6d6
| 242612 ||  || — || May 9, 2005 || Catalina || CSS || — || align=right | 4.1 km || 
|-id=613 bgcolor=#d6d6d6
| 242613 ||  || — || May 3, 2005 || Kitt Peak || Spacewatch || — || align=right | 3.4 km || 
|-id=614 bgcolor=#E9E9E9
| 242614 ||  || — || May 10, 2005 || Kitt Peak || Spacewatch || — || align=right | 3.0 km || 
|-id=615 bgcolor=#d6d6d6
| 242615 ||  || — || May 13, 2005 || Kitt Peak || Spacewatch || — || align=right | 3.5 km || 
|-id=616 bgcolor=#d6d6d6
| 242616 ||  || — || May 13, 2005 || Mount Lemmon || Mount Lemmon Survey || — || align=right | 3.3 km || 
|-id=617 bgcolor=#d6d6d6
| 242617 ||  || — || May 14, 2005 || Mount Lemmon || Mount Lemmon Survey || EUP || align=right | 4.3 km || 
|-id=618 bgcolor=#d6d6d6
| 242618 ||  || — || May 15, 2005 || Mount Lemmon || Mount Lemmon Survey || — || align=right | 3.7 km || 
|-id=619 bgcolor=#d6d6d6
| 242619 ||  || — || May 11, 2005 || Cerro Tololo || M. W. Buie || EMA || align=right | 3.9 km || 
|-id=620 bgcolor=#E9E9E9
| 242620 ||  || — || May 3, 2005 || Catalina || CSS || — || align=right | 1.7 km || 
|-id=621 bgcolor=#E9E9E9
| 242621 ||  || — || May 13, 2005 || Socorro || LINEAR || — || align=right | 2.7 km || 
|-id=622 bgcolor=#d6d6d6
| 242622 ||  || — || May 16, 2005 || Mount Lemmon || Mount Lemmon Survey || — || align=right | 3.6 km || 
|-id=623 bgcolor=#d6d6d6
| 242623 ||  || — || May 21, 2005 || Mount Lemmon || Mount Lemmon Survey || — || align=right | 5.1 km || 
|-id=624 bgcolor=#C2FFFF
| 242624 ||  || — || May 21, 2005 || Mount Lemmon || Mount Lemmon Survey || L4 || align=right | 12 km || 
|-id=625 bgcolor=#d6d6d6
| 242625 ||  || — || June 2, 2005 || Catalina || CSS || — || align=right | 4.2 km || 
|-id=626 bgcolor=#E9E9E9
| 242626 ||  || — || June 3, 2005 || Kitt Peak || Spacewatch || — || align=right | 3.0 km || 
|-id=627 bgcolor=#E9E9E9
| 242627 ||  || — || June 3, 2005 || Kitt Peak || Spacewatch || — || align=right | 3.1 km || 
|-id=628 bgcolor=#d6d6d6
| 242628 ||  || — || June 5, 2005 || Kitt Peak || Spacewatch || — || align=right | 3.4 km || 
|-id=629 bgcolor=#d6d6d6
| 242629 ||  || — || June 6, 2005 || Kitt Peak || Spacewatch || — || align=right | 3.8 km || 
|-id=630 bgcolor=#d6d6d6
| 242630 ||  || — || June 18, 2005 || Mount Lemmon || Mount Lemmon Survey || — || align=right | 6.2 km || 
|-id=631 bgcolor=#d6d6d6
| 242631 ||  || — || June 18, 2005 || Mount Lemmon || Mount Lemmon Survey || EUP || align=right | 4.8 km || 
|-id=632 bgcolor=#d6d6d6
| 242632 ||  || — || June 30, 2005 || Kitt Peak || Spacewatch || — || align=right | 4.8 km || 
|-id=633 bgcolor=#d6d6d6
| 242633 ||  || — || June 28, 2005 || Mount Lemmon || Mount Lemmon Survey || EOS || align=right | 2.7 km || 
|-id=634 bgcolor=#d6d6d6
| 242634 ||  || — || June 29, 2005 || Kitt Peak || Spacewatch || EUP || align=right | 3.6 km || 
|-id=635 bgcolor=#d6d6d6
| 242635 ||  || — || June 29, 2005 || Palomar || NEAT || — || align=right | 2.7 km || 
|-id=636 bgcolor=#E9E9E9
| 242636 ||  || — || June 29, 2005 || Kitt Peak || Spacewatch || PAD || align=right | 3.2 km || 
|-id=637 bgcolor=#E9E9E9
| 242637 ||  || — || June 30, 2005 || Kitt Peak || Spacewatch || HOF || align=right | 3.4 km || 
|-id=638 bgcolor=#d6d6d6
| 242638 ||  || — || June 29, 2005 || Palomar || NEAT || EUP || align=right | 4.7 km || 
|-id=639 bgcolor=#E9E9E9
| 242639 ||  || — || June 30, 2005 || Palomar || NEAT || — || align=right | 2.6 km || 
|-id=640 bgcolor=#d6d6d6
| 242640 || 2005 ND || — || July 2, 2005 || Wrightwood || J. W. Young || — || align=right | 2.6 km || 
|-id=641 bgcolor=#E9E9E9
| 242641 ||  || — || July 2, 2005 || Kitt Peak || Spacewatch || NEM || align=right | 3.1 km || 
|-id=642 bgcolor=#d6d6d6
| 242642 ||  || — || July 4, 2005 || Kitt Peak || Spacewatch || TRP || align=right | 3.1 km || 
|-id=643 bgcolor=#FFC2E0
| 242643 ||  || — || July 3, 2005 || Palomar || NEAT || APO +1kmPHA || align=right | 2.0 km || 
|-id=644 bgcolor=#fefefe
| 242644 ||  || — || July 3, 2005 || Mount Lemmon || Mount Lemmon Survey || — || align=right | 1.5 km || 
|-id=645 bgcolor=#fefefe
| 242645 ||  || — || July 1, 2005 || Kitt Peak || Spacewatch || H || align=right data-sort-value="0.68" | 680 m || 
|-id=646 bgcolor=#E9E9E9
| 242646 ||  || — || July 4, 2005 || Kitt Peak || Spacewatch || — || align=right | 4.0 km || 
|-id=647 bgcolor=#d6d6d6
| 242647 ||  || — || July 6, 2005 || Kitt Peak || Spacewatch || — || align=right | 3.7 km || 
|-id=648 bgcolor=#d6d6d6
| 242648 Fribourg ||  ||  || July 13, 2005 || Marly || P. Kocher || — || align=right | 4.0 km || 
|-id=649 bgcolor=#d6d6d6
| 242649 ||  || — || July 11, 2005 || Catalina || CSS || MEL || align=right | 6.7 km || 
|-id=650 bgcolor=#fefefe
| 242650 ||  || — || July 15, 2005 || Mount Lemmon || Mount Lemmon Survey || H || align=right data-sort-value="0.79" | 790 m || 
|-id=651 bgcolor=#d6d6d6
| 242651 ||  || — || July 30, 2005 || Socorro || LINEAR || — || align=right | 5.0 km || 
|-id=652 bgcolor=#fefefe
| 242652 ||  || — || July 27, 2005 || Palomar || NEAT || KLI || align=right | 3.1 km || 
|-id=653 bgcolor=#fefefe
| 242653 ||  || — || July 29, 2005 || Palomar || NEAT || — || align=right | 2.2 km || 
|-id=654 bgcolor=#fefefe
| 242654 ||  || — || August 4, 2005 || Palomar || NEAT || — || align=right | 1.9 km || 
|-id=655 bgcolor=#d6d6d6
| 242655 ||  || — || August 26, 2005 || Anderson Mesa || LONEOS || — || align=right | 2.3 km || 
|-id=656 bgcolor=#d6d6d6
| 242656 ||  || — || August 26, 2005 || Anderson Mesa || LONEOS || 3:2 || align=right | 7.0 km || 
|-id=657 bgcolor=#d6d6d6
| 242657 ||  || — || August 26, 2005 || Palomar || NEAT || EUP || align=right | 5.0 km || 
|-id=658 bgcolor=#d6d6d6
| 242658 ||  || — || August 25, 2005 || Palomar || NEAT || — || align=right | 4.5 km || 
|-id=659 bgcolor=#d6d6d6
| 242659 ||  || — || August 26, 2005 || Palomar || NEAT || NAE || align=right | 4.5 km || 
|-id=660 bgcolor=#d6d6d6
| 242660 ||  || — || August 29, 2005 || Goodricke-Pigott || R. A. Tucker || — || align=right | 4.5 km || 
|-id=661 bgcolor=#d6d6d6
| 242661 ||  || — || August 27, 2005 || Palomar || NEAT || 7:4 || align=right | 4.3 km || 
|-id=662 bgcolor=#d6d6d6
| 242662 ||  || — || August 30, 2005 || Palomar || NEAT || — || align=right | 5.0 km || 
|-id=663 bgcolor=#d6d6d6
| 242663 ||  || — || September 8, 2005 || Socorro || LINEAR || EOS || align=right | 2.7 km || 
|-id=664 bgcolor=#fefefe
| 242664 ||  || — || September 28, 2005 || Eskridge || G. Hug || — || align=right | 2.0 km || 
|-id=665 bgcolor=#d6d6d6
| 242665 ||  || — || September 25, 2005 || Kitt Peak || Spacewatch || THM || align=right | 4.0 km || 
|-id=666 bgcolor=#d6d6d6
| 242666 ||  || — || September 26, 2005 || Kitt Peak || Spacewatch || — || align=right | 2.8 km || 
|-id=667 bgcolor=#d6d6d6
| 242667 ||  || — || September 27, 2005 || Kitt Peak || Spacewatch || EUP || align=right | 5.7 km || 
|-id=668 bgcolor=#d6d6d6
| 242668 ||  || — || September 23, 2005 || Siding Spring || SSS || — || align=right | 12 km || 
|-id=669 bgcolor=#d6d6d6
| 242669 ||  || — || September 25, 2005 || Kitt Peak || Spacewatch || — || align=right | 4.2 km || 
|-id=670 bgcolor=#E9E9E9
| 242670 ||  || — || September 25, 2005 || Palomar || NEAT || — || align=right | 3.9 km || 
|-id=671 bgcolor=#d6d6d6
| 242671 ||  || — || September 26, 2005 || Kitt Peak || Spacewatch || — || align=right | 5.8 km || 
|-id=672 bgcolor=#d6d6d6
| 242672 ||  || — || September 29, 2005 || Catalina || CSS || — || align=right | 3.4 km || 
|-id=673 bgcolor=#d6d6d6
| 242673 ||  || — || September 29, 2005 || Palomar || NEAT || LIX || align=right | 4.7 km || 
|-id=674 bgcolor=#d6d6d6
| 242674 ||  || — || September 25, 2005 || Kitt Peak || Spacewatch || — || align=right | 3.9 km || 
|-id=675 bgcolor=#d6d6d6
| 242675 ||  || — || September 27, 2005 || Palomar || NEAT || VER || align=right | 4.1 km || 
|-id=676 bgcolor=#fefefe
| 242676 ||  || — || September 29, 2005 || Kitt Peak || Spacewatch || — || align=right | 2.0 km || 
|-id=677 bgcolor=#d6d6d6
| 242677 ||  || — || September 29, 2005 || Kitt Peak || Spacewatch || — || align=right | 4.7 km || 
|-id=678 bgcolor=#d6d6d6
| 242678 ||  || — || September 29, 2005 || Palomar || NEAT || EOS || align=right | 5.2 km || 
|-id=679 bgcolor=#d6d6d6
| 242679 ||  || — || September 29, 2005 || Kitt Peak || Spacewatch || HYG || align=right | 3.6 km || 
|-id=680 bgcolor=#d6d6d6
| 242680 ||  || — || September 30, 2005 || Mount Lemmon || Mount Lemmon Survey || — || align=right | 3.4 km || 
|-id=681 bgcolor=#d6d6d6
| 242681 ||  || — || September 30, 2005 || Mount Lemmon || Mount Lemmon Survey || ALA || align=right | 4.4 km || 
|-id=682 bgcolor=#d6d6d6
| 242682 ||  || — || September 30, 2005 || Mount Lemmon || Mount Lemmon Survey || SHU3:2 || align=right | 6.4 km || 
|-id=683 bgcolor=#d6d6d6
| 242683 ||  || — || September 30, 2005 || Kitt Peak || Spacewatch || — || align=right | 5.5 km || 
|-id=684 bgcolor=#d6d6d6
| 242684 ||  || — || September 23, 2005 || Catalina || CSS || — || align=right | 4.1 km || 
|-id=685 bgcolor=#d6d6d6
| 242685 ||  || — || September 22, 2005 || Palomar || NEAT || DUR || align=right | 4.3 km || 
|-id=686 bgcolor=#d6d6d6
| 242686 ||  || — || September 24, 2005 || Anderson Mesa || LONEOS || — || align=right | 4.3 km || 
|-id=687 bgcolor=#d6d6d6
| 242687 ||  || — || September 23, 2005 || Palomar || NEAT || — || align=right | 3.7 km || 
|-id=688 bgcolor=#fefefe
| 242688 ||  || — || September 26, 2005 || Palomar || NEAT || H || align=right | 1.2 km || 
|-id=689 bgcolor=#d6d6d6
| 242689 ||  || — || October 1, 2005 || Socorro || LINEAR || — || align=right | 3.6 km || 
|-id=690 bgcolor=#d6d6d6
| 242690 ||  || — || October 1, 2005 || Catalina || CSS || EOS || align=right | 2.8 km || 
|-id=691 bgcolor=#d6d6d6
| 242691 ||  || — || October 1, 2005 || Catalina || CSS || — || align=right | 4.0 km || 
|-id=692 bgcolor=#d6d6d6
| 242692 ||  || — || October 1, 2005 || Anderson Mesa || LONEOS || — || align=right | 3.6 km || 
|-id=693 bgcolor=#d6d6d6
| 242693 ||  || — || October 3, 2005 || Silver Spring || Silver Spring Obs. || — || align=right | 4.0 km || 
|-id=694 bgcolor=#d6d6d6
| 242694 ||  || — || October 1, 2005 || Socorro || LINEAR || — || align=right | 4.8 km || 
|-id=695 bgcolor=#d6d6d6
| 242695 ||  || — || October 1, 2005 || Anderson Mesa || LONEOS || — || align=right | 4.5 km || 
|-id=696 bgcolor=#d6d6d6
| 242696 ||  || — || October 1, 2005 || Mount Lemmon || Mount Lemmon Survey || THM || align=right | 4.5 km || 
|-id=697 bgcolor=#d6d6d6
| 242697 ||  || — || October 6, 2005 || Kitt Peak || Spacewatch || — || align=right | 5.4 km || 
|-id=698 bgcolor=#d6d6d6
| 242698 ||  || — || October 11, 2005 || Junk Bond || D. Healy || HYG || align=right | 4.7 km || 
|-id=699 bgcolor=#d6d6d6
| 242699 ||  || — || October 4, 2005 || Palomar || NEAT || — || align=right | 3.6 km || 
|-id=700 bgcolor=#d6d6d6
| 242700 ||  || — || October 4, 2005 || Mount Lemmon || Mount Lemmon Survey || — || align=right | 3.6 km || 
|}

242701–242800 

|-bgcolor=#d6d6d6
| 242701 ||  || — || October 5, 2005 || Catalina || CSS || — || align=right | 3.7 km || 
|-id=702 bgcolor=#d6d6d6
| 242702 ||  || — || October 3, 2005 || Catalina || CSS || — || align=right | 2.8 km || 
|-id=703 bgcolor=#d6d6d6
| 242703 ||  || — || October 7, 2005 || Catalina || CSS || TEL || align=right | 2.8 km || 
|-id=704 bgcolor=#d6d6d6
| 242704 ||  || — || October 7, 2005 || Kitt Peak || Spacewatch || — || align=right | 4.3 km || 
|-id=705 bgcolor=#d6d6d6
| 242705 ||  || — || October 7, 2005 || Kitt Peak || Spacewatch || THM || align=right | 2.8 km || 
|-id=706 bgcolor=#d6d6d6
| 242706 ||  || — || October 9, 2005 || Kitt Peak || Spacewatch || — || align=right | 3.0 km || 
|-id=707 bgcolor=#d6d6d6
| 242707 ||  || — || October 1, 2005 || Catalina || CSS || — || align=right | 3.0 km || 
|-id=708 bgcolor=#FFC2E0
| 242708 ||  || — || October 24, 2005 || Mount Lemmon || Mount Lemmon Survey || APO +1kmPHA || align=right data-sort-value="0.83" | 830 m || 
|-id=709 bgcolor=#d6d6d6
| 242709 ||  || — || October 23, 2005 || Kitt Peak || Spacewatch || EOS || align=right | 3.1 km || 
|-id=710 bgcolor=#d6d6d6
| 242710 ||  || — || October 23, 2005 || Catalina || CSS || THM || align=right | 3.3 km || 
|-id=711 bgcolor=#fefefe
| 242711 ||  || — || October 24, 2005 || Anderson Mesa || LONEOS || — || align=right | 2.3 km || 
|-id=712 bgcolor=#E9E9E9
| 242712 ||  || — || October 25, 2005 || Mount Lemmon || Mount Lemmon Survey || — || align=right | 2.4 km || 
|-id=713 bgcolor=#d6d6d6
| 242713 ||  || — || October 22, 2005 || Catalina || CSS || — || align=right | 4.3 km || 
|-id=714 bgcolor=#d6d6d6
| 242714 ||  || — || October 24, 2005 || Palomar || NEAT || — || align=right | 4.9 km || 
|-id=715 bgcolor=#d6d6d6
| 242715 ||  || — || October 25, 2005 || Catalina || CSS || — || align=right | 3.9 km || 
|-id=716 bgcolor=#d6d6d6
| 242716 ||  || — || October 22, 2005 || Kitt Peak || Spacewatch || — || align=right | 2.9 km || 
|-id=717 bgcolor=#fefefe
| 242717 ||  || — || October 22, 2005 || Kitt Peak || Spacewatch || NYS || align=right | 1.7 km || 
|-id=718 bgcolor=#E9E9E9
| 242718 ||  || — || October 22, 2005 || Kitt Peak || Spacewatch || — || align=right | 2.2 km || 
|-id=719 bgcolor=#d6d6d6
| 242719 ||  || — || October 24, 2005 || Palomar || NEAT || — || align=right | 3.1 km || 
|-id=720 bgcolor=#fefefe
| 242720 ||  || — || October 24, 2005 || Siding Spring || SSS || H || align=right data-sort-value="0.98" | 980 m || 
|-id=721 bgcolor=#d6d6d6
| 242721 ||  || — || October 25, 2005 || Catalina || CSS || — || align=right | 4.9 km || 
|-id=722 bgcolor=#E9E9E9
| 242722 ||  || — || October 26, 2005 || Kitt Peak || Spacewatch || — || align=right | 1.9 km || 
|-id=723 bgcolor=#E9E9E9
| 242723 ||  || — || October 26, 2005 || Palomar || NEAT || MIT || align=right | 2.6 km || 
|-id=724 bgcolor=#d6d6d6
| 242724 ||  || — || October 26, 2005 || Palomar || NEAT || — || align=right | 5.3 km || 
|-id=725 bgcolor=#fefefe
| 242725 ||  || — || October 25, 2005 || Kitt Peak || Spacewatch || — || align=right | 1.7 km || 
|-id=726 bgcolor=#d6d6d6
| 242726 ||  || — || October 25, 2005 || Kitt Peak || Spacewatch || — || align=right | 4.8 km || 
|-id=727 bgcolor=#d6d6d6
| 242727 ||  || — || October 24, 2005 || Kitt Peak || Spacewatch || HYG || align=right | 4.2 km || 
|-id=728 bgcolor=#d6d6d6
| 242728 ||  || — || October 25, 2005 || Mount Lemmon || Mount Lemmon Survey || THM || align=right | 2.5 km || 
|-id=729 bgcolor=#d6d6d6
| 242729 ||  || — || October 27, 2005 || Kitt Peak || Spacewatch || 7:4 || align=right | 4.9 km || 
|-id=730 bgcolor=#E9E9E9
| 242730 ||  || — || October 25, 2005 || Mount Lemmon || Mount Lemmon Survey || — || align=right | 4.2 km || 
|-id=731 bgcolor=#d6d6d6
| 242731 ||  || — || October 26, 2005 || Kitt Peak || Spacewatch || HYG || align=right | 4.1 km || 
|-id=732 bgcolor=#d6d6d6
| 242732 ||  || — || October 29, 2005 || Mount Lemmon || Mount Lemmon Survey || — || align=right | 3.1 km || 
|-id=733 bgcolor=#d6d6d6
| 242733 ||  || — || October 24, 2005 || Palomar || NEAT || — || align=right | 5.3 km || 
|-id=734 bgcolor=#fefefe
| 242734 ||  || — || October 29, 2005 || Mount Lemmon || Mount Lemmon Survey || — || align=right | 1.6 km || 
|-id=735 bgcolor=#d6d6d6
| 242735 ||  || — || October 27, 2005 || Kitt Peak || Spacewatch || THM || align=right | 2.9 km || 
|-id=736 bgcolor=#E9E9E9
| 242736 ||  || — || October 28, 2005 || Socorro || LINEAR || AER || align=right | 2.8 km || 
|-id=737 bgcolor=#d6d6d6
| 242737 ||  || — || October 27, 2005 || Kitt Peak || Spacewatch || — || align=right | 5.1 km || 
|-id=738 bgcolor=#fefefe
| 242738 ||  || — || October 28, 2005 || Mount Lemmon || Mount Lemmon Survey || — || align=right | 1.7 km || 
|-id=739 bgcolor=#d6d6d6
| 242739 ||  || — || October 29, 2005 || Catalina || CSS || — || align=right | 4.7 km || 
|-id=740 bgcolor=#d6d6d6
| 242740 ||  || — || October 24, 2005 || Palomar || NEAT || EOS || align=right | 5.8 km || 
|-id=741 bgcolor=#E9E9E9
| 242741 ||  || — || October 31, 2005 || Mount Lemmon || Mount Lemmon Survey || — || align=right | 2.5 km || 
|-id=742 bgcolor=#d6d6d6
| 242742 ||  || — || October 30, 2005 || Catalina || CSS || URS || align=right | 5.1 km || 
|-id=743 bgcolor=#d6d6d6
| 242743 ||  || — || October 25, 2005 || Catalina || CSS || — || align=right | 6.1 km || 
|-id=744 bgcolor=#E9E9E9
| 242744 ||  || — || October 24, 2005 || Palomar || NEAT || — || align=right | 2.2 km || 
|-id=745 bgcolor=#d6d6d6
| 242745 ||  || — || November 2, 2005 || Mount Lemmon || Mount Lemmon Survey || MEL || align=right | 5.1 km || 
|-id=746 bgcolor=#d6d6d6
| 242746 ||  || — || November 1, 2005 || Catalina || CSS || — || align=right | 3.7 km || 
|-id=747 bgcolor=#d6d6d6
| 242747 ||  || — || November 2, 2005 || Catalina || CSS || — || align=right | 4.7 km || 
|-id=748 bgcolor=#fefefe
| 242748 ||  || — || November 1, 2005 || Mount Lemmon || Mount Lemmon Survey || — || align=right | 3.1 km || 
|-id=749 bgcolor=#d6d6d6
| 242749 ||  || — || November 6, 2005 || Anderson Mesa || LONEOS || — || align=right | 4.6 km || 
|-id=750 bgcolor=#d6d6d6
| 242750 ||  || — || November 6, 2005 || Mount Lemmon || Mount Lemmon Survey || HYG || align=right | 3.4 km || 
|-id=751 bgcolor=#d6d6d6
| 242751 ||  || — || November 6, 2005 || Kitt Peak || Spacewatch || — || align=right | 4.6 km || 
|-id=752 bgcolor=#fefefe
| 242752 ||  || — || November 10, 2005 || Catalina || CSS || H || align=right data-sort-value="0.97" | 970 m || 
|-id=753 bgcolor=#E9E9E9
| 242753 ||  || — || November 9, 2005 || Campo Imperatore || CINEOS || MIS || align=right | 2.3 km || 
|-id=754 bgcolor=#d6d6d6
| 242754 ||  || — || November 22, 2005 || Socorro || LINEAR || — || align=right | 4.4 km || 
|-id=755 bgcolor=#fefefe
| 242755 ||  || — || November 21, 2005 || Kitt Peak || Spacewatch || ERI || align=right | 2.4 km || 
|-id=756 bgcolor=#fefefe
| 242756 ||  || — || November 26, 2005 || Mount Lemmon || Mount Lemmon Survey || — || align=right | 1.8 km || 
|-id=757 bgcolor=#d6d6d6
| 242757 ||  || — || November 21, 2005 || Anderson Mesa || LONEOS || — || align=right | 7.5 km || 
|-id=758 bgcolor=#fefefe
| 242758 ||  || — || November 25, 2005 || Kitt Peak || Spacewatch || NYS || align=right | 1.8 km || 
|-id=759 bgcolor=#fefefe
| 242759 ||  || — || November 28, 2005 || Catalina || CSS || NYS || align=right | 1.7 km || 
|-id=760 bgcolor=#fefefe
| 242760 ||  || — || November 29, 2005 || Mount Lemmon || Mount Lemmon Survey || H || align=right data-sort-value="0.62" | 620 m || 
|-id=761 bgcolor=#E9E9E9
| 242761 ||  || — || November 28, 2005 || Mount Lemmon || Mount Lemmon Survey || — || align=right | 3.0 km || 
|-id=762 bgcolor=#E9E9E9
| 242762 ||  || — || November 25, 2005 || Catalina || CSS || — || align=right | 2.0 km || 
|-id=763 bgcolor=#fefefe
| 242763 ||  || — || November 25, 2005 || Mount Lemmon || Mount Lemmon Survey || FLO || align=right | 2.4 km || 
|-id=764 bgcolor=#E9E9E9
| 242764 ||  || — || November 29, 2005 || Palomar || NEAT || — || align=right | 3.0 km || 
|-id=765 bgcolor=#E9E9E9
| 242765 ||  || — || November 29, 2005 || Palomar || NEAT || — || align=right | 1.3 km || 
|-id=766 bgcolor=#fefefe
| 242766 ||  || — || November 28, 2005 || Mount Lemmon || Mount Lemmon Survey || KLI || align=right | 2.2 km || 
|-id=767 bgcolor=#fefefe
| 242767 ||  || — || November 30, 2005 || Kitt Peak || Spacewatch || FLO || align=right | 1.4 km || 
|-id=768 bgcolor=#E9E9E9
| 242768 ||  || — || November 30, 2005 || Mount Lemmon || Mount Lemmon Survey || PAD || align=right | 2.9 km || 
|-id=769 bgcolor=#d6d6d6
| 242769 ||  || — || November 25, 2005 || Catalina || CSS || EOS || align=right | 3.6 km || 
|-id=770 bgcolor=#fefefe
| 242770 ||  || — || December 5, 2005 || Mount Lemmon || Mount Lemmon Survey || — || align=right | 1.8 km || 
|-id=771 bgcolor=#E9E9E9
| 242771 ||  || — || December 7, 2005 || Socorro || LINEAR || — || align=right | 2.0 km || 
|-id=772 bgcolor=#fefefe
| 242772 ||  || — || December 5, 2005 || Socorro || LINEAR || — || align=right | 3.3 km || 
|-id=773 bgcolor=#fefefe
| 242773 ||  || — || December 1, 2005 || Kitt Peak || M. W. Buie || NYS || align=right | 2.5 km || 
|-id=774 bgcolor=#fefefe
| 242774 ||  || — || December 1, 2005 || Kitt Peak || M. W. Buie || NYS || align=right | 2.1 km || 
|-id=775 bgcolor=#d6d6d6
| 242775 ||  || — || December 1, 2005 || Kitt Peak || M. W. Buie || — || align=right | 3.5 km || 
|-id=776 bgcolor=#fefefe
| 242776 ||  || — || December 24, 2005 || Kitt Peak || Spacewatch || — || align=right | 1.5 km || 
|-id=777 bgcolor=#E9E9E9
| 242777 ||  || — || December 22, 2005 || Catalina || CSS || — || align=right | 2.4 km || 
|-id=778 bgcolor=#fefefe
| 242778 ||  || — || December 21, 2005 || Catalina || CSS || — || align=right | 1.8 km || 
|-id=779 bgcolor=#d6d6d6
| 242779 ||  || — || December 22, 2005 || Catalina || CSS || — || align=right | 4.0 km || 
|-id=780 bgcolor=#E9E9E9
| 242780 ||  || — || December 25, 2005 || Kitt Peak || Spacewatch || — || align=right | 2.0 km || 
|-id=781 bgcolor=#d6d6d6
| 242781 ||  || — || December 25, 2005 || Kitt Peak || Spacewatch || — || align=right | 4.8 km || 
|-id=782 bgcolor=#fefefe
| 242782 ||  || — || December 27, 2005 || Mount Lemmon || Mount Lemmon Survey || NYS || align=right | 1.6 km || 
|-id=783 bgcolor=#fefefe
| 242783 ||  || — || December 25, 2005 || Mount Lemmon || Mount Lemmon Survey || NYS || align=right | 2.2 km || 
|-id=784 bgcolor=#fefefe
| 242784 ||  || — || December 26, 2005 || Kitt Peak || Spacewatch || — || align=right | 1.1 km || 
|-id=785 bgcolor=#E9E9E9
| 242785 ||  || — || December 27, 2005 || Mount Lemmon || Mount Lemmon Survey || HOF || align=right | 2.8 km || 
|-id=786 bgcolor=#fefefe
| 242786 ||  || — || December 27, 2005 || Kitt Peak || Spacewatch || — || align=right | 1.4 km || 
|-id=787 bgcolor=#fefefe
| 242787 ||  || — || December 28, 2005 || Mount Lemmon || Mount Lemmon Survey || — || align=right | 1.8 km || 
|-id=788 bgcolor=#fefefe
| 242788 ||  || — || December 29, 2005 || Kitt Peak || Spacewatch || — || align=right | 1.9 km || 
|-id=789 bgcolor=#fefefe
| 242789 ||  || — || December 27, 2005 || Mount Lemmon || Mount Lemmon Survey || NYS || align=right | 1.7 km || 
|-id=790 bgcolor=#fefefe
| 242790 ||  || — || January 4, 2006 || Kitt Peak || Spacewatch || — || align=right data-sort-value="0.93" | 930 m || 
|-id=791 bgcolor=#fefefe
| 242791 ||  || — || January 5, 2006 || Kitt Peak || Spacewatch || — || align=right data-sort-value="0.78" | 780 m || 
|-id=792 bgcolor=#d6d6d6
| 242792 ||  || — || January 5, 2006 || Kitt Peak || Spacewatch || — || align=right | 5.8 km || 
|-id=793 bgcolor=#fefefe
| 242793 ||  || — || January 8, 2006 || Mount Lemmon || Mount Lemmon Survey || — || align=right data-sort-value="0.97" | 970 m || 
|-id=794 bgcolor=#fefefe
| 242794 ||  || — || January 6, 2006 || Kitt Peak || Spacewatch || ERI || align=right | 1.4 km || 
|-id=795 bgcolor=#fefefe
| 242795 ||  || — || January 11, 2006 || Kitt Peak || Spacewatch || — || align=right | 1.0 km || 
|-id=796 bgcolor=#fefefe
| 242796 ||  || — || January 20, 2006 || Catalina || CSS || ERI || align=right | 1.4 km || 
|-id=797 bgcolor=#d6d6d6
| 242797 ||  || — || January 20, 2006 || Catalina || CSS || TRE || align=right | 4.5 km || 
|-id=798 bgcolor=#fefefe
| 242798 ||  || — || January 21, 2006 || Mount Lemmon || Mount Lemmon Survey || FLO || align=right | 1.0 km || 
|-id=799 bgcolor=#fefefe
| 242799 ||  || — || January 22, 2006 || Anderson Mesa || LONEOS || — || align=right | 1.7 km || 
|-id=800 bgcolor=#fefefe
| 242800 ||  || — || January 23, 2006 || Kitt Peak || Spacewatch || — || align=right | 2.4 km || 
|}

242801–242900 

|-bgcolor=#d6d6d6
| 242801 ||  || — || January 25, 2006 || Kitt Peak || Spacewatch || HYG || align=right | 5.1 km || 
|-id=802 bgcolor=#fefefe
| 242802 ||  || — || January 27, 2006 || 7300 || W. K. Y. Yeung || — || align=right | 2.8 km || 
|-id=803 bgcolor=#d6d6d6
| 242803 ||  || — || January 23, 2006 || Kitt Peak || Spacewatch || — || align=right | 5.2 km || 
|-id=804 bgcolor=#d6d6d6
| 242804 ||  || — || January 23, 2006 || Kitt Peak || Spacewatch || CRO || align=right | 5.2 km || 
|-id=805 bgcolor=#fefefe
| 242805 ||  || — || January 25, 2006 || Kitt Peak || Spacewatch || — || align=right | 1.0 km || 
|-id=806 bgcolor=#fefefe
| 242806 ||  || — || January 26, 2006 || Kitt Peak || Spacewatch || — || align=right | 1.3 km || 
|-id=807 bgcolor=#fefefe
| 242807 ||  || — || January 26, 2006 || Kitt Peak || Spacewatch || NYS || align=right data-sort-value="0.85" | 850 m || 
|-id=808 bgcolor=#fefefe
| 242808 ||  || — || January 26, 2006 || Kitt Peak || Spacewatch || ERI || align=right | 2.4 km || 
|-id=809 bgcolor=#fefefe
| 242809 ||  || — || January 26, 2006 || Kitt Peak || Spacewatch || V || align=right data-sort-value="0.72" | 720 m || 
|-id=810 bgcolor=#fefefe
| 242810 ||  || — || January 26, 2006 || Mount Lemmon || Mount Lemmon Survey || — || align=right data-sort-value="0.72" | 720 m || 
|-id=811 bgcolor=#fefefe
| 242811 ||  || — || January 23, 2006 || Catalina || CSS || — || align=right | 2.5 km || 
|-id=812 bgcolor=#d6d6d6
| 242812 ||  || — || January 23, 2006 || Kitt Peak || Spacewatch || — || align=right | 4.3 km || 
|-id=813 bgcolor=#fefefe
| 242813 ||  || — || January 24, 2006 || Anderson Mesa || LONEOS || — || align=right | 1.2 km || 
|-id=814 bgcolor=#fefefe
| 242814 ||  || — || January 25, 2006 || Kitt Peak || Spacewatch || — || align=right | 2.7 km || 
|-id=815 bgcolor=#d6d6d6
| 242815 ||  || — || January 25, 2006 || Kitt Peak || Spacewatch || — || align=right | 3.4 km || 
|-id=816 bgcolor=#fefefe
| 242816 ||  || — || January 26, 2006 || Mount Lemmon || Mount Lemmon Survey || NYS || align=right data-sort-value="0.96" | 960 m || 
|-id=817 bgcolor=#d6d6d6
| 242817 ||  || — || January 26, 2006 || Mount Lemmon || Mount Lemmon Survey || — || align=right | 2.7 km || 
|-id=818 bgcolor=#E9E9E9
| 242818 ||  || — || January 26, 2006 || Mount Lemmon || Mount Lemmon Survey || ADE || align=right | 2.0 km || 
|-id=819 bgcolor=#fefefe
| 242819 ||  || — || January 30, 2006 || Catalina || CSS || NYS || align=right | 1.6 km || 
|-id=820 bgcolor=#fefefe
| 242820 ||  || — || January 31, 2006 || Kitt Peak || Spacewatch || — || align=right | 2.4 km || 
|-id=821 bgcolor=#fefefe
| 242821 ||  || — || January 31, 2006 || Kitt Peak || Spacewatch || — || align=right | 1.0 km || 
|-id=822 bgcolor=#fefefe
| 242822 ||  || — || January 31, 2006 || Mount Lemmon || Mount Lemmon Survey || — || align=right | 1.1 km || 
|-id=823 bgcolor=#FA8072
| 242823 ||  || — || January 23, 2006 || Kitt Peak || Spacewatch || — || align=right | 1.2 km || 
|-id=824 bgcolor=#fefefe
| 242824 ||  || — || February 2, 2006 || Kitt Peak || Spacewatch || KLI || align=right | 2.0 km || 
|-id=825 bgcolor=#d6d6d6
| 242825 ||  || — || February 4, 2006 || Mount Lemmon || Mount Lemmon Survey || — || align=right | 3.9 km || 
|-id=826 bgcolor=#fefefe
| 242826 ||  || — || February 4, 2006 || Kitt Peak || Spacewatch || EUT || align=right data-sort-value="0.74" | 740 m || 
|-id=827 bgcolor=#fefefe
| 242827 ||  || — || February 4, 2006 || Mount Lemmon || Mount Lemmon Survey || NYS || align=right data-sort-value="0.74" | 740 m || 
|-id=828 bgcolor=#d6d6d6
| 242828 ||  || — || February 20, 2006 || Mount Lemmon || Mount Lemmon Survey || — || align=right | 4.2 km || 
|-id=829 bgcolor=#fefefe
| 242829 ||  || — || February 20, 2006 || Kitt Peak || Spacewatch || MAS || align=right data-sort-value="0.85" | 850 m || 
|-id=830 bgcolor=#d6d6d6
| 242830 Richardwessling ||  ||  || February 21, 2006 || Antares || R. Holmes || — || align=right | 4.6 km || 
|-id=831 bgcolor=#fefefe
| 242831 ||  || — || February 21, 2006 || Kitt Peak || Spacewatch || — || align=right | 2.3 km || 
|-id=832 bgcolor=#d6d6d6
| 242832 ||  || — || February 20, 2006 || Mount Lemmon || Mount Lemmon Survey || LIX || align=right | 6.3 km || 
|-id=833 bgcolor=#fefefe
| 242833 ||  || — || February 20, 2006 || Kitt Peak || Spacewatch || — || align=right data-sort-value="0.89" | 890 m || 
|-id=834 bgcolor=#d6d6d6
| 242834 ||  || — || February 23, 2006 || Kitt Peak || Spacewatch || — || align=right | 5.1 km || 
|-id=835 bgcolor=#fefefe
| 242835 ||  || — || February 22, 2006 || Anderson Mesa || LONEOS || — || align=right | 1.3 km || 
|-id=836 bgcolor=#d6d6d6
| 242836 ||  || — || February 23, 2006 || Anderson Mesa || LONEOS || ARM || align=right | 5.7 km || 
|-id=837 bgcolor=#d6d6d6
| 242837 ||  || — || February 21, 2006 || Catalina || CSS || — || align=right | 4.1 km || 
|-id=838 bgcolor=#E9E9E9
| 242838 ||  || — || February 24, 2006 || Kitt Peak || Spacewatch || — || align=right | 2.1 km || 
|-id=839 bgcolor=#E9E9E9
| 242839 ||  || — || February 24, 2006 || Kitt Peak || Spacewatch || — || align=right | 2.9 km || 
|-id=840 bgcolor=#fefefe
| 242840 ||  || — || February 25, 2006 || Kitt Peak || Spacewatch || — || align=right | 1.2 km || 
|-id=841 bgcolor=#E9E9E9
| 242841 ||  || — || February 25, 2006 || Kitt Peak || Spacewatch || KRM || align=right | 3.0 km || 
|-id=842 bgcolor=#fefefe
| 242842 ||  || — || February 21, 2006 || Catalina || CSS || NYS || align=right | 1.0 km || 
|-id=843 bgcolor=#C2FFFF
| 242843 ||  || — || February 25, 2006 || Mount Lemmon || Mount Lemmon Survey || L5 || align=right | 17 km || 
|-id=844 bgcolor=#fefefe
| 242844 || 2006 EM || — || March 5, 2006 || Mayhill || A. Lowe || ERI || align=right | 2.1 km || 
|-id=845 bgcolor=#d6d6d6
| 242845 ||  || — || March 2, 2006 || Kitt Peak || Spacewatch || EOS || align=right | 3.0 km || 
|-id=846 bgcolor=#E9E9E9
| 242846 ||  || — || March 4, 2006 || Catalina || CSS || — || align=right | 3.1 km || 
|-id=847 bgcolor=#E9E9E9
| 242847 ||  || — || March 4, 2006 || Kitt Peak || Spacewatch || — || align=right | 2.1 km || 
|-id=848 bgcolor=#d6d6d6
| 242848 ||  || — || March 4, 2006 || Catalina || CSS || ALA || align=right | 4.6 km || 
|-id=849 bgcolor=#fefefe
| 242849 ||  || — || March 5, 2006 || Kitt Peak || Spacewatch || — || align=right | 1.2 km || 
|-id=850 bgcolor=#fefefe
| 242850 ||  || — || March 23, 2006 || Mount Lemmon || Mount Lemmon Survey || — || align=right | 1.4 km || 
|-id=851 bgcolor=#d6d6d6
| 242851 ||  || — || March 23, 2006 || Kitt Peak || Spacewatch || SHU3:2 || align=right | 7.2 km || 
|-id=852 bgcolor=#fefefe
| 242852 ||  || — || March 23, 2006 || Kitt Peak || Spacewatch || — || align=right | 1.8 km || 
|-id=853 bgcolor=#E9E9E9
| 242853 ||  || — || March 24, 2006 || Anderson Mesa || LONEOS || — || align=right | 3.1 km || 
|-id=854 bgcolor=#d6d6d6
| 242854 ||  || — || March 26, 2006 || Anderson Mesa || LONEOS || HYG || align=right | 4.9 km || 
|-id=855 bgcolor=#fefefe
| 242855 ||  || — || March 25, 2006 || Mount Lemmon || Mount Lemmon Survey || PHO || align=right | 1.3 km || 
|-id=856 bgcolor=#fefefe
| 242856 ||  || — || March 24, 2006 || Mount Lemmon || Mount Lemmon Survey || FLO || align=right data-sort-value="0.98" | 980 m || 
|-id=857 bgcolor=#E9E9E9
| 242857 ||  || — || March 26, 2006 || Kitt Peak || Spacewatch || — || align=right | 2.1 km || 
|-id=858 bgcolor=#fefefe
| 242858 ||  || — || April 2, 2006 || Kitt Peak || Spacewatch || CLA || align=right | 1.9 km || 
|-id=859 bgcolor=#E9E9E9
| 242859 ||  || — || April 2, 2006 || Kitt Peak || Spacewatch || — || align=right | 3.0 km || 
|-id=860 bgcolor=#E9E9E9
| 242860 ||  || — || April 2, 2006 || Kitt Peak || Spacewatch || — || align=right | 2.1 km || 
|-id=861 bgcolor=#E9E9E9
| 242861 ||  || — || April 2, 2006 || Mount Lemmon || Mount Lemmon Survey || ADE || align=right | 3.2 km || 
|-id=862 bgcolor=#E9E9E9
| 242862 ||  || — || April 2, 2006 || Mount Lemmon || Mount Lemmon Survey || MIT || align=right | 3.0 km || 
|-id=863 bgcolor=#fefefe
| 242863 ||  || — || April 6, 2006 || Socorro || LINEAR || — || align=right | 2.4 km || 
|-id=864 bgcolor=#E9E9E9
| 242864 ||  || — || April 9, 2006 || Anderson Mesa || LONEOS || slow || align=right | 2.3 km || 
|-id=865 bgcolor=#fefefe
| 242865 ||  || — || April 19, 2006 || Anderson Mesa || LONEOS || — || align=right | 1.3 km || 
|-id=866 bgcolor=#E9E9E9
| 242866 ||  || — || April 19, 2006 || Anderson Mesa || LONEOS || — || align=right | 3.8 km || 
|-id=867 bgcolor=#d6d6d6
| 242867 ||  || — || April 20, 2006 || Kitt Peak || Spacewatch || — || align=right | 5.2 km || 
|-id=868 bgcolor=#fefefe
| 242868 ||  || — || April 20, 2006 || Kitt Peak || Spacewatch || FLO || align=right data-sort-value="0.70" | 700 m || 
|-id=869 bgcolor=#fefefe
| 242869 ||  || — || April 25, 2006 || Kitt Peak || Spacewatch || — || align=right | 1.1 km || 
|-id=870 bgcolor=#E9E9E9
| 242870 ||  || — || April 24, 2006 || Kitt Peak || Spacewatch || — || align=right | 3.6 km || 
|-id=871 bgcolor=#fefefe
| 242871 ||  || — || April 25, 2006 || Kitt Peak || Spacewatch || MAS || align=right data-sort-value="0.67" | 670 m || 
|-id=872 bgcolor=#fefefe
| 242872 ||  || — || April 26, 2006 || Kitt Peak || Spacewatch || NYS || align=right data-sort-value="0.90" | 900 m || 
|-id=873 bgcolor=#fefefe
| 242873 ||  || — || April 18, 2006 || Anderson Mesa || LONEOS || — || align=right | 1.3 km || 
|-id=874 bgcolor=#E9E9E9
| 242874 ||  || — || April 19, 2006 || Catalina || CSS || RAF || align=right | 1.8 km || 
|-id=875 bgcolor=#E9E9E9
| 242875 ||  || — || April 21, 2006 || Catalina || CSS || — || align=right | 2.5 km || 
|-id=876 bgcolor=#fefefe
| 242876 ||  || — || April 26, 2006 || Kitt Peak || Spacewatch || — || align=right | 1.3 km || 
|-id=877 bgcolor=#E9E9E9
| 242877 ||  || — || April 30, 2006 || Kitt Peak || Spacewatch || — || align=right | 2.0 km || 
|-id=878 bgcolor=#E9E9E9
| 242878 ||  || — || April 30, 2006 || Kitt Peak || Spacewatch || — || align=right | 3.6 km || 
|-id=879 bgcolor=#E9E9E9
| 242879 ||  || — || April 29, 2006 || Siding Spring || SSS || MIT || align=right | 4.2 km || 
|-id=880 bgcolor=#E9E9E9
| 242880 ||  || — || April 25, 2006 || Kitt Peak || Spacewatch || PAD || align=right | 2.7 km || 
|-id=881 bgcolor=#E9E9E9
| 242881 ||  || — || April 30, 2006 || Kitt Peak || Spacewatch || — || align=right | 1.7 km || 
|-id=882 bgcolor=#E9E9E9
| 242882 ||  || — || April 26, 2006 || Mount Lemmon || Mount Lemmon Survey || — || align=right | 3.1 km || 
|-id=883 bgcolor=#E9E9E9
| 242883 ||  || — || May 2, 2006 || Nyukasa || Mount Nyukasa Stn. || — || align=right | 2.5 km || 
|-id=884 bgcolor=#E9E9E9
| 242884 ||  || — || May 1, 2006 || Kitt Peak || Spacewatch || — || align=right | 2.2 km || 
|-id=885 bgcolor=#d6d6d6
| 242885 ||  || — || May 1, 2006 || Kitt Peak || Spacewatch || CHA || align=right | 3.1 km || 
|-id=886 bgcolor=#E9E9E9
| 242886 ||  || — || May 1, 2006 || Kitt Peak || Spacewatch || — || align=right | 3.0 km || 
|-id=887 bgcolor=#E9E9E9
| 242887 ||  || — || May 4, 2006 || Kitt Peak || Spacewatch || — || align=right | 2.8 km || 
|-id=888 bgcolor=#E9E9E9
| 242888 ||  || — || May 7, 2006 || Mount Lemmon || Mount Lemmon Survey || — || align=right | 2.4 km || 
|-id=889 bgcolor=#E9E9E9
| 242889 ||  || — || May 1, 2006 || Socorro || LINEAR || — || align=right | 3.2 km || 
|-id=890 bgcolor=#E9E9E9
| 242890 ||  || — || May 2, 2006 || Catalina || CSS || JUN || align=right | 1.6 km || 
|-id=891 bgcolor=#E9E9E9
| 242891 ||  || — || May 14, 2006 || Palomar || NEAT || — || align=right | 2.2 km || 
|-id=892 bgcolor=#E9E9E9
| 242892 ||  || — || May 18, 2006 || Palomar || NEAT || — || align=right | 3.2 km || 
|-id=893 bgcolor=#fefefe
| 242893 ||  || — || May 19, 2006 || Anderson Mesa || LONEOS || — || align=right | 1.6 km || 
|-id=894 bgcolor=#fefefe
| 242894 ||  || — || May 19, 2006 || Catalina || CSS || — || align=right | 1.4 km || 
|-id=895 bgcolor=#E9E9E9
| 242895 ||  || — || May 18, 2006 || Palomar || NEAT || — || align=right | 1.6 km || 
|-id=896 bgcolor=#fefefe
| 242896 ||  || — || May 20, 2006 || Kitt Peak || Spacewatch || — || align=right | 1.1 km || 
|-id=897 bgcolor=#E9E9E9
| 242897 ||  || — || May 23, 2006 || Kitt Peak || Spacewatch || — || align=right | 3.2 km || 
|-id=898 bgcolor=#fefefe
| 242898 ||  || — || May 27, 2006 || Catalina || CSS || NYS || align=right | 2.8 km || 
|-id=899 bgcolor=#E9E9E9
| 242899 ||  || — || May 31, 2006 || Mount Lemmon || Mount Lemmon Survey || — || align=right | 3.2 km || 
|-id=900 bgcolor=#E9E9E9
| 242900 ||  || — || May 31, 2006 || Mount Lemmon || Mount Lemmon Survey || — || align=right | 4.3 km || 
|}

242901–243000 

|-bgcolor=#fefefe
| 242901 ||  || — || May 30, 2006 || Catalina || CSS || PHO || align=right | 2.9 km || 
|-id=902 bgcolor=#d6d6d6
| 242902 ||  || — || May 26, 2006 || Catalina || CSS || Tj (2.97) || align=right | 8.1 km || 
|-id=903 bgcolor=#E9E9E9
| 242903 ||  || — || May 30, 2006 || Socorro || LINEAR || — || align=right | 2.5 km || 
|-id=904 bgcolor=#d6d6d6
| 242904 ||  || — || May 30, 2006 || Kitt Peak || Spacewatch || ALA || align=right | 6.4 km || 
|-id=905 bgcolor=#E9E9E9
| 242905 ||  || — || May 30, 2006 || Siding Spring || SSS || BRU || align=right | 4.4 km || 
|-id=906 bgcolor=#E9E9E9
| 242906 ||  || — || May 23, 2006 || Kitt Peak || Spacewatch || MIT || align=right | 2.7 km || 
|-id=907 bgcolor=#E9E9E9
| 242907 ||  || — || June 1, 2006 || Catalina || CSS || — || align=right | 2.3 km || 
|-id=908 bgcolor=#E9E9E9
| 242908 ||  || — || June 5, 2006 || Socorro || LINEAR || — || align=right | 1.5 km || 
|-id=909 bgcolor=#d6d6d6
| 242909 ||  || — || June 3, 2006 || Siding Spring || SSS || DUR || align=right | 6.4 km || 
|-id=910 bgcolor=#E9E9E9
| 242910 ||  || — || June 16, 2006 || Kitt Peak || Spacewatch || — || align=right | 3.3 km || 
|-id=911 bgcolor=#E9E9E9
| 242911 ||  || — || June 19, 2006 || Catalina || CSS || JUN || align=right | 2.6 km || 
|-id=912 bgcolor=#fefefe
| 242912 ||  || — || June 21, 2006 || Kitt Peak || Spacewatch || — || align=right | 1.7 km || 
|-id=913 bgcolor=#E9E9E9
| 242913 ||  || — || June 27, 2006 || Hibiscus || S. F. Hönig || — || align=right | 1.8 km || 
|-id=914 bgcolor=#d6d6d6
| 242914 ||  || — || June 21, 2006 || Palomar || NEAT || — || align=right | 4.5 km || 
|-id=915 bgcolor=#fefefe
| 242915 ||  || — || July 9, 2006 || Vail-Jarnac || Jarnac Obs. || — || align=right | 1.7 km || 
|-id=916 bgcolor=#fefefe
| 242916 ||  || — || July 19, 2006 || Lulin Observatory || LUSS || NYS || align=right | 2.4 km || 
|-id=917 bgcolor=#C2FFFF
| 242917 ||  || — || July 19, 2006 || Lulin || LUSS || L4 || align=right | 11 km || 
|-id=918 bgcolor=#E9E9E9
| 242918 ||  || — || July 19, 2006 || Palomar || NEAT || — || align=right | 1.9 km || 
|-id=919 bgcolor=#E9E9E9
| 242919 ||  || — || July 24, 2006 || Eskridge || Farpoint Obs. || JUN || align=right | 1.9 km || 
|-id=920 bgcolor=#E9E9E9
| 242920 ||  || — || July 21, 2006 || Mount Lemmon || Mount Lemmon Survey || — || align=right | 3.2 km || 
|-id=921 bgcolor=#d6d6d6
| 242921 ||  || — || July 20, 2006 || Siding Spring || SSS || — || align=right | 5.0 km || 
|-id=922 bgcolor=#E9E9E9
| 242922 ||  || — || August 12, 2006 || Palomar || NEAT || NEM || align=right | 2.9 km || 
|-id=923 bgcolor=#E9E9E9
| 242923 ||  || — || August 12, 2006 || Palomar || NEAT || — || align=right | 2.1 km || 
|-id=924 bgcolor=#d6d6d6
| 242924 ||  || — || August 15, 2006 || Lulin Observatory || C.-S. Lin, Q.-z. Ye || — || align=right | 5.9 km || 
|-id=925 bgcolor=#d6d6d6
| 242925 ||  || — || August 17, 2006 || Palomar || NEAT || — || align=right | 5.5 km || 
|-id=926 bgcolor=#E9E9E9
| 242926 ||  || — || August 19, 2006 || Palomar || NEAT || — || align=right | 2.2 km || 
|-id=927 bgcolor=#d6d6d6
| 242927 ||  || — || August 20, 2006 || Siding Spring || SSS || — || align=right | 4.6 km || 
|-id=928 bgcolor=#E9E9E9
| 242928 ||  || — || August 17, 2006 || Palomar || NEAT || INO || align=right | 1.6 km || 
|-id=929 bgcolor=#E9E9E9
| 242929 ||  || — || August 19, 2006 || Anderson Mesa || LONEOS || AGN || align=right | 2.0 km || 
|-id=930 bgcolor=#d6d6d6
| 242930 ||  || — || August 20, 2006 || Palomar || NEAT || — || align=right | 4.2 km || 
|-id=931 bgcolor=#E9E9E9
| 242931 ||  || — || August 20, 2006 || Palomar || NEAT || HNA || align=right | 3.2 km || 
|-id=932 bgcolor=#E9E9E9
| 242932 ||  || — || August 23, 2006 || Črni Vrh || Črni Vrh || — || align=right | 2.1 km || 
|-id=933 bgcolor=#E9E9E9
| 242933 ||  || — || August 24, 2006 || Socorro || LINEAR || JUN || align=right | 3.2 km || 
|-id=934 bgcolor=#d6d6d6
| 242934 ||  || — || August 19, 2006 || Anderson Mesa || LONEOS || ALA || align=right | 5.4 km || 
|-id=935 bgcolor=#E9E9E9
| 242935 ||  || — || August 21, 2006 || Palomar || NEAT || — || align=right | 3.1 km || 
|-id=936 bgcolor=#E9E9E9
| 242936 ||  || — || August 21, 2006 || Palomar || NEAT || — || align=right | 1.8 km || 
|-id=937 bgcolor=#d6d6d6
| 242937 ||  || — || August 21, 2006 || Kitt Peak || Spacewatch || — || align=right | 2.7 km || 
|-id=938 bgcolor=#E9E9E9
| 242938 ||  || — || August 28, 2006 || Catalina || CSS || DOR || align=right | 3.4 km || 
|-id=939 bgcolor=#E9E9E9
| 242939 ||  || — || August 29, 2006 || Catalina || CSS || GEF || align=right | 3.2 km || 
|-id=940 bgcolor=#d6d6d6
| 242940 ||  || — || August 29, 2006 || Catalina || CSS || — || align=right | 3.5 km || 
|-id=941 bgcolor=#d6d6d6
| 242941 ||  || — || August 30, 2006 || Anderson Mesa || LONEOS || DUR || align=right | 4.7 km || 
|-id=942 bgcolor=#d6d6d6
| 242942 ||  || — || August 17, 2006 || Palomar || NEAT || ULA7:4 || align=right | 6.9 km || 
|-id=943 bgcolor=#d6d6d6
| 242943 ||  || — || September 14, 2006 || Kitt Peak || Spacewatch || — || align=right | 3.7 km || 
|-id=944 bgcolor=#E9E9E9
| 242944 ||  || — || September 15, 2006 || Kitt Peak || Spacewatch || KON || align=right | 2.3 km || 
|-id=945 bgcolor=#d6d6d6
| 242945 ||  || — || September 14, 2006 || Palomar || NEAT || EOS || align=right | 2.9 km || 
|-id=946 bgcolor=#d6d6d6
| 242946 ||  || — || September 14, 2006 || Catalina || CSS || — || align=right | 5.2 km || 
|-id=947 bgcolor=#d6d6d6
| 242947 ||  || — || September 14, 2006 || Kitt Peak || Spacewatch || SYL7:4 || align=right | 5.5 km || 
|-id=948 bgcolor=#d6d6d6
| 242948 ||  || — || September 14, 2006 || Kitt Peak || Spacewatch || — || align=right | 6.3 km || 
|-id=949 bgcolor=#E9E9E9
| 242949 ||  || — || September 15, 2006 || Kitt Peak || Spacewatch || — || align=right | 3.0 km || 
|-id=950 bgcolor=#d6d6d6
| 242950 ||  || — || September 15, 2006 || Kitt Peak || Spacewatch || — || align=right | 3.4 km || 
|-id=951 bgcolor=#d6d6d6
| 242951 ||  || — || September 15, 2006 || Kitt Peak || Spacewatch || — || align=right | 3.1 km || 
|-id=952 bgcolor=#d6d6d6
| 242952 ||  || — || September 6, 2006 || Palomar || NEAT || — || align=right | 4.8 km || 
|-id=953 bgcolor=#d6d6d6
| 242953 ||  || — || September 16, 2006 || Palomar || NEAT || EUP || align=right | 4.9 km || 
|-id=954 bgcolor=#E9E9E9
| 242954 ||  || — || September 16, 2006 || Catalina || CSS || — || align=right | 2.4 km || 
|-id=955 bgcolor=#E9E9E9
| 242955 ||  || — || September 17, 2006 || Catalina || CSS || PAD || align=right | 3.6 km || 
|-id=956 bgcolor=#d6d6d6
| 242956 ||  || — || September 17, 2006 || Anderson Mesa || LONEOS || EOS || align=right | 3.0 km || 
|-id=957 bgcolor=#d6d6d6
| 242957 ||  || — || September 16, 2006 || Catalina || CSS || HYG || align=right | 5.0 km || 
|-id=958 bgcolor=#d6d6d6
| 242958 ||  || — || September 17, 2006 || Kitt Peak || Spacewatch || — || align=right | 5.2 km || 
|-id=959 bgcolor=#d6d6d6
| 242959 ||  || — || September 17, 2006 || Kitt Peak || Spacewatch || VER || align=right | 5.4 km || 
|-id=960 bgcolor=#d6d6d6
| 242960 ||  || — || September 18, 2006 || Kitt Peak || Spacewatch || — || align=right | 4.6 km || 
|-id=961 bgcolor=#E9E9E9
| 242961 ||  || — || September 18, 2006 || Catalina || CSS || — || align=right | 4.3 km || 
|-id=962 bgcolor=#d6d6d6
| 242962 ||  || — || September 19, 2006 || Calvin-Rehoboth || Calvin–Rehoboth Obs. || — || align=right | 3.7 km || 
|-id=963 bgcolor=#E9E9E9
| 242963 ||  || — || September 16, 2006 || Catalina || CSS || — || align=right | 3.4 km || 
|-id=964 bgcolor=#d6d6d6
| 242964 ||  || — || September 19, 2006 || Kitt Peak || Spacewatch || — || align=right | 4.3 km || 
|-id=965 bgcolor=#E9E9E9
| 242965 ||  || — || September 19, 2006 || Kitt Peak || Spacewatch || — || align=right | 1.9 km || 
|-id=966 bgcolor=#d6d6d6
| 242966 ||  || — || September 17, 2006 || Catalina || CSS || 7:4 || align=right | 7.1 km || 
|-id=967 bgcolor=#d6d6d6
| 242967 ||  || — || September 18, 2006 || Kitt Peak || Spacewatch || — || align=right | 4.4 km || 
|-id=968 bgcolor=#E9E9E9
| 242968 ||  || — || September 19, 2006 || Catalina || CSS || — || align=right | 4.2 km || 
|-id=969 bgcolor=#E9E9E9
| 242969 ||  || — || September 22, 2006 || Catalina || CSS || — || align=right | 2.8 km || 
|-id=970 bgcolor=#d6d6d6
| 242970 ||  || — || September 23, 2006 || Kitt Peak || Spacewatch || — || align=right | 5.3 km || 
|-id=971 bgcolor=#d6d6d6
| 242971 ||  || — || September 24, 2006 || Anderson Mesa || LONEOS || — || align=right | 5.0 km || 
|-id=972 bgcolor=#d6d6d6
| 242972 ||  || — || September 18, 2006 || Catalina || CSS || VER || align=right | 4.1 km || 
|-id=973 bgcolor=#d6d6d6
| 242973 ||  || — || September 18, 2006 || Catalina || CSS || — || align=right | 4.9 km || 
|-id=974 bgcolor=#E9E9E9
| 242974 ||  || — || September 19, 2006 || Catalina || CSS || — || align=right | 3.3 km || 
|-id=975 bgcolor=#d6d6d6
| 242975 ||  || — || September 21, 2006 || Uccle || T. Pauwels || EOS || align=right | 3.1 km || 
|-id=976 bgcolor=#E9E9E9
| 242976 ||  || — || September 20, 2006 || Catalina || CSS || EUN || align=right | 1.7 km || 
|-id=977 bgcolor=#d6d6d6
| 242977 ||  || — || September 25, 2006 || Kitt Peak || Spacewatch || HYG || align=right | 3.4 km || 
|-id=978 bgcolor=#d6d6d6
| 242978 ||  || — || September 25, 2006 || Mount Lemmon || Mount Lemmon Survey || — || align=right | 4.1 km || 
|-id=979 bgcolor=#d6d6d6
| 242979 ||  || — || September 26, 2006 || Catalina || CSS || TIR || align=right | 5.2 km || 
|-id=980 bgcolor=#d6d6d6
| 242980 ||  || — || September 26, 2006 || Catalina || CSS || — || align=right | 4.6 km || 
|-id=981 bgcolor=#d6d6d6
| 242981 ||  || — || September 26, 2006 || Kitt Peak || Spacewatch || — || align=right | 6.0 km || 
|-id=982 bgcolor=#E9E9E9
| 242982 ||  || — || September 26, 2006 || Kitt Peak || Spacewatch || — || align=right | 2.8 km || 
|-id=983 bgcolor=#E9E9E9
| 242983 ||  || — || September 26, 2006 || Kitt Peak || Spacewatch || — || align=right | 3.1 km || 
|-id=984 bgcolor=#E9E9E9
| 242984 ||  || — || September 27, 2006 || Kitt Peak || Spacewatch || — || align=right | 1.8 km || 
|-id=985 bgcolor=#d6d6d6
| 242985 ||  || — || September 28, 2006 || Mount Lemmon || Mount Lemmon Survey || — || align=right | 6.3 km || 
|-id=986 bgcolor=#d6d6d6
| 242986 ||  || — || September 27, 2006 || Kitt Peak || Spacewatch || — || align=right | 3.2 km || 
|-id=987 bgcolor=#E9E9E9
| 242987 ||  || — || September 27, 2006 || Kitt Peak || Spacewatch || — || align=right | 1.5 km || 
|-id=988 bgcolor=#d6d6d6
| 242988 ||  || — || September 30, 2006 || Mount Lemmon || Mount Lemmon Survey || HYG || align=right | 3.7 km || 
|-id=989 bgcolor=#d6d6d6
| 242989 ||  || — || September 17, 2006 || Catalina || CSS || — || align=right | 5.1 km || 
|-id=990 bgcolor=#E9E9E9
| 242990 ||  || — || September 24, 2006 || Anderson Mesa || LONEOS || ADE || align=right | 1.8 km || 
|-id=991 bgcolor=#d6d6d6
| 242991 ||  || — || September 18, 2006 || Anderson Mesa || LONEOS || — || align=right | 4.7 km || 
|-id=992 bgcolor=#d6d6d6
| 242992 ||  || — || September 25, 2006 || Catalina || CSS || EUP || align=right | 6.2 km || 
|-id=993 bgcolor=#d6d6d6
| 242993 ||  || — || September 18, 2006 || Catalina || CSS || — || align=right | 4.3 km || 
|-id=994 bgcolor=#E9E9E9
| 242994 ||  || — || September 17, 2006 || Catalina || CSS || MAR || align=right | 2.3 km || 
|-id=995 bgcolor=#d6d6d6
| 242995 ||  || — || October 11, 2006 || Kitt Peak || Spacewatch || — || align=right | 3.5 km || 
|-id=996 bgcolor=#d6d6d6
| 242996 ||  || — || October 11, 2006 || Kitt Peak || Spacewatch || 3:2 || align=right | 7.8 km || 
|-id=997 bgcolor=#E9E9E9
| 242997 ||  || — || October 12, 2006 || Kitt Peak || Spacewatch || HEN || align=right | 3.8 km || 
|-id=998 bgcolor=#d6d6d6
| 242998 ||  || — || October 12, 2006 || Palomar || NEAT || — || align=right | 3.4 km || 
|-id=999 bgcolor=#E9E9E9
| 242999 ||  || — || October 12, 2006 || Palomar || NEAT || — || align=right | 3.3 km || 
|-id=000 bgcolor=#d6d6d6
| 243000 Katysirles ||  ||  || October 1, 2006 || Apache Point || A. C. Becker || — || align=right | 4.4 km || 
|}

References

External links 
 Discovery Circumstances: Numbered Minor Planets (240001)–(245000) (IAU Minor Planet Center)

0242